= Archaeal virus =

Type of virus that infects the domain of unicellular, prokaryotic organisms or Archaea

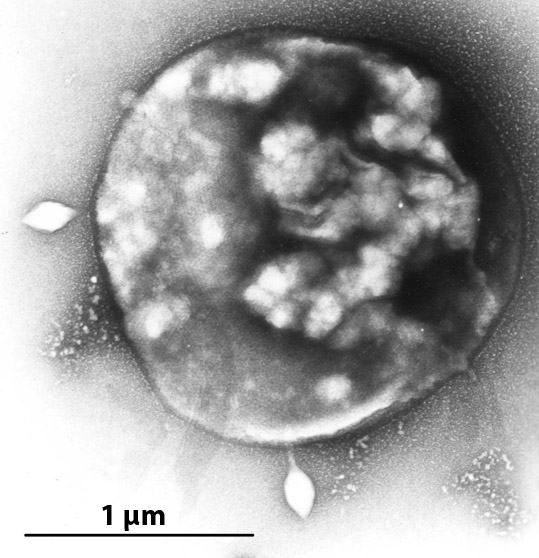
A Sulfolobus archaeon infected with STSV-1. Two spindle-shaped virions are visible near the surface of the cell.

An archaeal virus is a virus that infects and replicates in archaea, a domain of unicellular, prokaryotic organisms. Archaeal viruses, like their hosts, are found worldwide, including in extreme environments inhospitable to most life such as acidic hot springs, highly saline bodies of water, and at the bottom of the ocean. They have been also found in the human body. The first known archaeal virus was described in 1974 and since then, a large diversity of archaeal viruses have been discovered, many possessing unique characteristics not found in other viruses. Little is known about their biological processes, such as how they replicate, but they are believed to have many independent origins, some of which likely predate the last archaeal common ancestor (LACA).

Much of the diversity observed in archaeal viruses is their morphology. Their complete bodies, called virions, come in many different forms, including being shaped like spindles or lemons, rods, bottles, droplets, and coils. Some contain a viral envelope, a lipid membrane that surrounds the viral capsid, which stores the viral genome. In some cases, the envelope surrounds the genome inside the capsid. All known archaeal viruses have genomes made of deoxyribonucleic acid (DNA). Almost all that have been identified contain double-stranded DNA genomes, a small minority having single-stranded DNA genomes. A large portion of the genes encoded by archaeal viruses have no known function or homology to any other genes.

Compared to bacterial and eukaryotic viruses, few archaeal viruses have been described in detail. Despite this, those that have been studied are highly diverse and classified to more than 20 families, many of which show no relation to any other known viruses. In general, all archaeal viruses can be placed into two broad groups: those that are related to bacterial and eukaryotic viruses and those that are not. The former includes viruses found in the realms Duplodnaviria, Singelaviria, and Varidnaviria, which likely have ancient origins preceding the LACA, and the latter includes the realm Adnaviria and all archaeal virus families unassigned to higher taxa, which are thought to have more recent origins from non-viral mobile genetic elements such as plasmids.

How archaeal viruses interact with their hosts and the environment is largely unknown. Many establish a persistent infection, during which progeny are continually produced at a low rate without killing the host archaeon. Some have evolved alongside their hosts, adapting to the environments in which archaea live. For example, bicaudaviruses grow two tails on opposite ends of their bodies after they leave their host cell, which may help them find a new host in sparsely populated environments. In oceans, archaeal viruses are believed to play a major role in recycling nutrients, especially at the bottom of the ocean where they are a major cause of death. For some archaeal viruses in hypersaline environments, the level of salinity can affect infectivity and virus behavior.

Research areas in archaeal virology include gaining a better understanding of their diversity and learning about their means of replication. Some environments, such as acidic hot springs, are almost exclusively populated by archaea, so these environments are highly useful for studying how archaeal viruses interact with their hosts. Because a large portion of their genes have no known function, there is a large reserve of genetic material to be explored. In the early decades of archaeal virus research, Wolfram Zillig and his colleagues discovered numerous archaeal virus families. Since 2000, methods such as metagenomics have identified many novel archaeal viruses, and methods such as cryogenic electron microscopy and gene synteny have helped to better understand their evolutionary history.

== Terminology ==
Archaeal viruses were originally referred to as "bacteriophages" or simply "phages", terms shared with bacterial viruses. This reflected the classification at the time of archaea with bacteria in a system that separated prokaryotes from eukaryotes. The first official name given to archaea was "archaebacteria", leading to terms such as "archaebacterial phages" being used. At around the same time as the adoption of archaebacteria as a name, though, archaeal viruses began to be referred to as viruses, not phages. The trend from "phage" to "virus" when describing archaeal viruses progressed throughout the 1980s. In 1990, Archaea was established as a domain with the adoption of a three domain classification system that separated archaea, bacteria, and eukaryotes from each other. Within a few years, the term "archaebacterial virus" began to be replaced by "archaeal virus".

Since 1990, "archaeal virus" has been the dominant term when describing viruses that infect archaea. Many synonyms of "archaeal virus" have been used, including archaeovirus, archaeavirus, archaevirus, archeovirus, archael virus, archeal virus, archae virus, and archaeon virus. It is common for "archaeal virus" to be prefixed by the type of archaea infected. For example, "crenarchaeal virus" denotes viruses of the Archaea phylum Thermoproteota (formerly Crenarchaeota). The terms "thermophilic", "mesophilic", "psychrophilic", and "halophilic" are also commonly used when discussing archaeal viruses, denoting viruses of archaea in high-temperature, moderate-temperature, low-temperature, and saline environments respectively. In the latter case, "halovirus" and "haloarchaeal virus" are also used.

== Classification ==
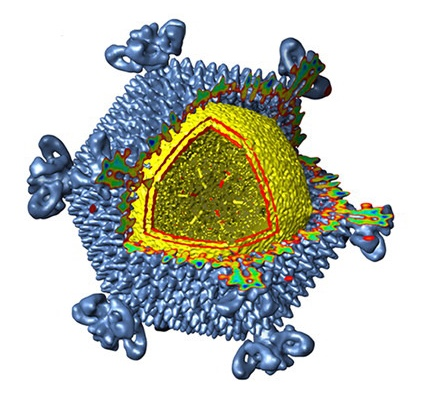
Cryoelectron microscopy reconstruction of Sulfolobus turreted icosahedral virus (STIV) showing a cutaway view of the T = 31 symmetry icosahedral capsid with turret-like projections that extend from each of the 5-fold vertices. Portions of the protein shell (blue) and inner lipid layer (yellow) have been removed to reveal the interior.

The number of classified archaeal viruses is relatively small, but due to their high level of diversity they are assigned to many different families, most of which were established specifically so the viruses could be classified. Many of these archaeal virus families are unassigned to higher taxa. The highest rank in virus taxonomy is realm, and archaeal viruses that are assigned to a realm fall into one of four realms. Their classification is shown hereafter (-viria denotes realm, -viricetes denotes class, -virales denotes order, and -viridae denotes family):

- Adnaviria - among virus realms, this is the only one that exclusively contains archaeal viruses:
  - Tokiviricetes
    - Ligamenvirales
      - Lipothrixviridae
      - Rudiviridae
    - Primavirales
      - Tristromaviridae
- Duplodnaviria:
  - Caudoviricetes
- Pleomoviria:
  - Caminiviricetes
    - Ageovirales
      - Thalassapleoviridae
  - Huolimaviricetes
    - Haloruvirales
      - Nanopleoviridae
      - Pleolipoviridae
- Singelaviria
  - Laserviricetes
    - Ducavirales
      - Nanicoviridae
    - Halopanivirales
      - Simuloviridae
      - Sphaerolipoviridae (Note: Prior to 2020, Sphaerolipoviridae was the sole family in the order Halopanivirales, but it was split and its two previous genera that contained archaeal viruses now correspond to the families Simuloviridae and Sphaerolipoviridae. Where sources prior to 2020 refer to Sphaerolipoviridae, this article uses "Halopanivirales".)
    - Salinicovirales
      - Halicoviridae
- Varidnaviria
  - Belvinaviricetes
    - Atroposvirales
      - Skuldviridae
    - Belfryvirales
      - Turriviridae
    - Coyopavirales
      - Chaacviridae

Unassigned families:

- Ampullaviridae
- Basaltiviridae
- Bicaudaviridae
- Clavaviridae
- Eurekaviridae
- Fuselloviridae
- Globuloviridae
- Guttaviridae
- Halspiviridae (Note: Halspiviridae contains only one genus: Salterprovirus. This genus is often named when referring to viruses of this family.)
- Huangdiviridae
- Itzamnaviridae
- Lomiviridae
- Nipumfusiviridae
- Ovaliviridae
- Portogloboviridae (Note: Although Portogloboviridae is unassigned to any higher taxa, the family is related to viruses in the realm Varidnaviria.)
- Spiraviridae
- Thaspiviridae
- Xigoviridae
- Yamazakiviridae

A distinction is often made between archaeal viruses that have no morphological or genetic relation to non-archaeal viruses and those that do. The latter include: halophilic archaeal caudoviruses, which are related to bacterial caudoviruses and eukaryotic herpesviruses; Simuloviridae and Sphaerolipoviridae, which infect halophilic archaea and which are related to bacterial viruses in Matshushitaviridae; and Turriviridae, which is related to bacterial virus families Tectiviridae and Corticoviridae and many eukaryotic virus families such as Adenoviridae.

An additional group of unclassified archaeal viruses named Magroviruses show a relation to other caudoviruses. Many mesophilic archaeal caudoviruses have been identified through metagenomics but have yet to be isolated. Putative archaeal viruses of Nitrososphaerota (formerly Thaumarchaeota) and "Euryarchaeota" in the water column and sediments have been identified but have not been cultured.

Archaea-specific virus groups include the realm Adnaviria, pleolipoviruses, which are classified in Monodnaviria, and all archaeal virus families unassigned to higher taxa. Two archaeal viruses first described in 2017 are Metallosphaera turreted icosahedral virus and Methanosarcina spherical virus. These two viruses are both unique and show no relation to any other known viruses, so they are likely to be classified into novel families in the future. Additionally, there are viruses that are morphologically similar to bicaudaviruses called monocaudaviruses, but these viruses have yet to be classified.

== Morphology ==
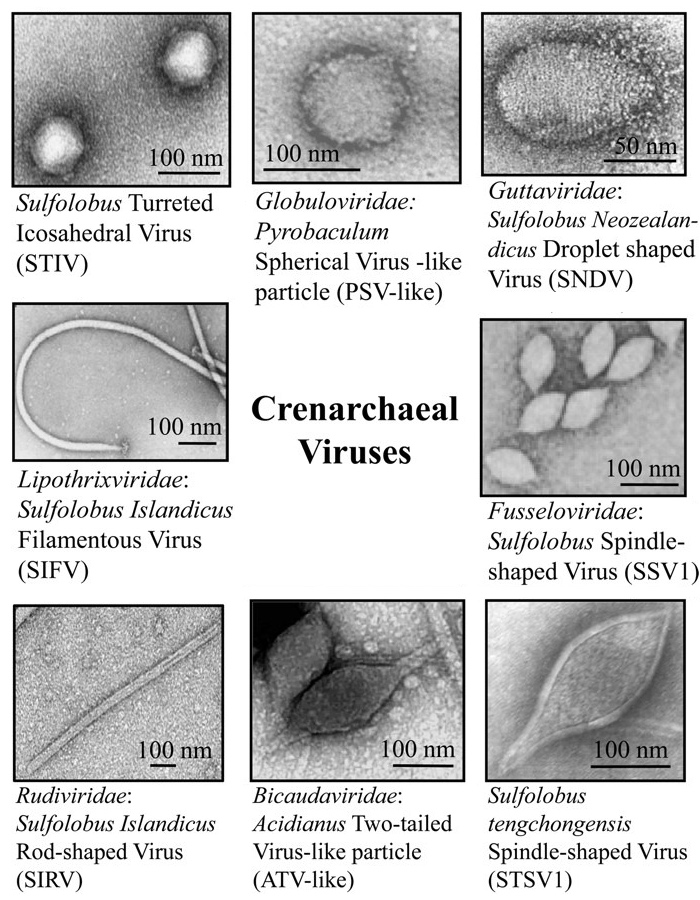
Morphological diversity in crenarchaeal viruses

Although few archaeal viruses have been described, they are very diverse morphologically and have some structural characteristics not found in other types of viruses. Ampullaviruses are bottle-shaped; bicaudaviruses, fuselloviruses, thaspiviruses and halspiviruses are spindle- or lemon-shaped, often pleomorphic; spiraviruses are coil-shaped; guttaviruses are droplet-shaped. Clavaviruses, rudiviruses, lipothrixviruses, and tristromaviruses have filamentous – flexible or rigid – virions, the latter two of which contain envelopes surrounding the capsid, in contrast to all other known filamentous viruses, which lack a lipid membrane.

Globuloviruses are spherical or pleomorphic, pleolipoviruses have a pleomorphous membrane vesicle-like shape, and ovaliviruses have a spool-like capsid enclosed in an ellipsoidal or ovoid envelope. Caudoviruses have a head-tail structure in which an icosahedral capsid is the "head" of the virion and is connected to a "tail". The tail may be long and contractile, long and non-contractile, or short. Portogloboviruses, halopaniviruses, and turriviruses are tailless with icosahedral capsids. Among these, halopaniviruses contain a lipid membrane within the capsid around the genome.

A shared characteristic of many groups of archaeal viruses is the folded structure of the major capsid protein (MCP). Portogloboviruses MCPs contain two antiparallel beta sheets, called a single jelly roll (SJR) fold, halopaniviruses have two paralogous SJR fold MCPs, and turriviruses have a single MCP with two jelly roll folds. This jelly roll fold is a uniting feature of viruses in Varidnaviria. The MCPs of archaeal viruses in Caudovirales, along with other viruses in Duplodnaviria, are marked by the HK97-like fold. Those of Adnaviria possess the SIRV2 fold, a type of alpha-helix bundle, and the MCPs of bicaudaviruses possess the ATV-like fold, another type of alpha-helix bundle. The architectural classes of the MCPs of other archaeal virus groups are unknown, although a four-helix bundle domain is common in the MCPs of spindle-shaped viruses.

== Genetics ==
All isolated archaeal viruses have genomes made of deoxyribonucleic acid (DNA). Metagenomic research has detected putative archaeal viruses that have genomes made of ribonucleic acid (RNA), but the actual hosts of these viruses have not been identified, and they have not been isolated yet. The vast majority of archaeal viruses have double-stranded DNA (dsDNA) genomes. Pleolipoviridae and Spiraviridae are the only known archaeal virus families to have single-stranded DNA (ssDNA) genomes. Among pleolipoviruses, closely related alphapleolipoviruses can have either dsDNA or ssDNA genomes, indicating there is flexibility in which structure can be incorporated into mature virus particles. Genetic relation can, however, still be shown between these viruses based on gene homology and synteny.

The genomes of archaeal viruses vary in size significantly, ranging from 5.3 kilobases (kb) in clavavirus Aeropyrum pernix bacilliform virus 1 (APBV1) to 143.8 kb in the myovirus HGTV-1. Archaea-specific viruses tend to have smaller genomes than other archaeal viruses, especially viruses in Caudovirales. APBV1 with a genome of about 5 kb, is one of the smallest known dsDNA viruses. Spiravirus Aeropyrum coil-shaped virus has the largest known genome of an ssDNA virus at about 35 kb. Some archaeal viruses, namely viruses of Adnaviria, package their DNA in A-form as a result of an interaction between the MCP and B-form pre-genomic DNA.

Few proteins encoded by archaeal viruses, especially those that infect archaea of Thermoproteota, show a relation to other known proteins. For viruses in Ampullaviridae, Globuloviridae, Spiraviridae, Portogloboviridae, and Tristromaviridae, less than 10% of encoded proteins are homologous to proteins found in cellular life or other viruses. In total, the functions of about 85% of crenarchaeal virus genes are unknown. Consequently, archaeal viruses constitute a large source of unknown genes to be researched. It is likely that many of these genes help overcome host defense responses, outcompete other viruses, and adapt to changes in the extreme geochemical environment of their hosts. Fuselloviruses and pleolipoviruses are frequently integrated into their hosts' genome, giving the false impression of encoding many cellular proteins. For most archaeal virus families, however, a significant minority of viral proteins are homologous to proteins found in archaea. Archaeal viruses also appear to share many genes with non-viral selfish replicons such as plasmids and transposons.

== Life cycle ==
Many aspects of the life cycle of archaeal viruses are unknown and have mainly been inferred from recognizable genes encoded by them. Specific cellular receptors archaeal viruses bind to on the surface of cells have not been identified, but many are able to bind to extracellular structures such as pili, including Sulfolobus turreted icosahedral virus (STIV) and Acidianus filamentous virus 1 (AFV1), which bind to pili via claw-like structures on the virion. Sulfolobus islandicus rod-shaped virus 2 (SIRV2) attaches to pili and then moves along the pili toward the cell. Caudoviruses attach to the surface of cells via their tail. Pleolipoviruses and halopaniviruses possess spike proteins that bind to the surface of cells. Little is known about how archaeal virus DNA enters the host cell. Caudoviruses inject their DNA through their tail. Haloarcula virus HCIV1, a halopanivirus, has been observed to form tube-like structures between the virion and cell surface, which may be used to deliver the viral genome to the cell.

SIRV2 appears to replicate through a combination of strand-displacement, rolling circle, and strand-coupled replication. This process produces a highly branched, "brush-like" intermediate molecule containing many copies of the genome. Unit-length genomes are then processed from concatemers in the molecule. AFV1 has been suggested to start replication by forming a D-loop, then progressing through strand-displacement synthesis. Replication is then terminated by relying on recombination events through the formation of terminal loop-like structures. Pleolipoviruses with circular genomes replicate through rolling circle replication, and those with linear genomes via protein-primed replication. Overall, archaeal viruses follow the general trend observed in dsDNA viruses in which viruses with larger genomes approach self-sufficiency in replication. Caudoviruses in particular appear to have little reliance on host replication machinery.

The archaeal homolog of the endosomal sorting complex required for transport (ESCRT) is used by some archaeal viruses for assembly and exit. Sulfolobus turreted icosahedral virus 1 (STIV1) and SIRV2 exit cells through pyramidal structures formed on the surface of infected cells that open like flower petals. This lyses the cell, leaving behind an empty sphere with holes where the pyramids were located. Pleolipoviruses are likely released from cells via vesicle formation and budding, during which lipids from the host cell membrane are recruited to serve as the viral envelope. Halopaniviruses are released from cells via lysis and by unorganized release from the cell that eventually results in lysis.

Archaeal virus infections can be virulent, temperate, or persistent. Virulent viruses replicate by producing progeny in the host cell after infection, ultimately causing cell death. Temperate viruses can form stable lysogens with their hosts while being able to produce progeny at a later time. Other infections can be persistent, during which progeny viruses are continually produced at a low rate without causing cell lysis in a host state commonly called the carrier state. Most known archaeal viruses establish a persistent infection, being common among haloviruses and dominant among hyperthermophilic archaeal viruses. Only a few archaeal viruses have been reported to have a virulent, or lytic, life cycle. Some archaeal viruses encode an integrase that facilitates integration of their DNA into the DNA of their hosts, thereby establishing a temperate, or lysogenic, life cycle. Lysogeny can then be interrupted by stress factors, leading to viral replication and cell lysis. The high prevalence of chronic viral infections in archaea may act as a form of inter-virus competition, preventing an archaeon from being infected by other, potentially fatal, viruses.

== Phylogenetics ==
Archaeal viruses appear to have two types of origins: ancient origins that preceded the last archaeal common ancestor (LACA), and more recent origins from non-viral mobile genetic elements (MGEs). "Ancient" archaeal viruses group together into one of two groups: the first group contains tailed bacterial viruses and eukaryotic herpesviruses in the realm Duplodnaviria; the other group contains bacterial and eukaryotic viruses in the realm Varidnaviria. Both of these realms are likely to predate the LACA.

Archaea-specific virus groups, on the other hand, are largely separated from all other viruses, suggesting independent origins of these viruses and little horizontal gene transfer with other viruses. Furthermore, archaea-specific virus groups lack shared hallmark genes involved in core replication and morphogenetic functions, such as a shared major capsid protein, further indicating that archaea-specific virus groups lack common ancestry. At least two archaea-specific virus groups may have been present in the LACA: spindle-shaped viruses and the realm Adnaviria. It is possible that some archaea-specific virus groups predated the LACA but were lost in other cellular domains.

Despite the little relation between archaeal virus groups, many show a genetic relation to non-viral MGEs, especially plasmids, with which they share various genes. This suggests that many archaeal viruses are descended from MGEs that acquired genes for virion formation. Notably, archaea can harbor both plasmids and viruses at the same time, facilitating frequent genetic exchange. Some MGEs may be descended from archaeal viruses, such as TKV4-like proviruses and pTN3-like integrative plasmids of Thermococcus, which encode proteins signature of Varidnaviria but do not appear to produce virions.

In some cases, there is a blurring of lines between archaeal viruses and archaeal plasmids. For example, a plasmid of an Antarctic archaeon is transmitted between cells in a vesicle that has plasmid-encoded proteins embedded in the lipid membrane, making this plasmid highly similar morphologically to pleolipoviruses. Sulfolobus plasmids pSSVi and pSSVx not only show relation to fuselloviruses but act as satellites of them and can be encapsidated in spindle-shaped particles upon coinfection with fuselloviruses SSV1 or SSV2, which enables them to spread in a virus-like manner.

== Evolution ==
Many unusual characteristics of archaeal viruses of hyperthermophiles likely represent adaptations required for replication in their hosts and for stability in extreme environmental conditions. Additionally, genetic mutations occur in archaeal viruses at a higher rate than bacterial DNA viruses and are more frequent in coding regions than non-coding regions, which may contribute to the phenotypic diversity of archaeal viruses. The A-form DNA of genomes of viruses in Adnaviria is likely a mechanism to protect DNA from harsh environmental conditions since A-form DNA is found in various biological entities in extreme environments. Similarly, the genome of clavavirus APBV1 is packaged in a tight, left-handed superhelix with its major capsid proteins, reflecting an adaptation allowing for DNA to survive at high temperatures.

High-temperature, low-pH (i.e. acidic) environments inhabited by archaea have a low density of cells. Furthermore, the half-life of archaeal viruses in high temperatures is often short, at less than an hour, so some viruses have evolved mechanisms to overcome these challenges. Acidianus two-tailed virus (ATV), a bicaudavirus, undergoes a conformational change in virion structure after it leaves a cell. The central spindle-shape of the virion contracts in width and two tails extend outward on opposite sides. This change occurs in the absence of a host cell, energy source, or external cofactors, and likely represents a way for the virus to more easily identify a new host by increasing the area it can search.

Almost all cultured thermophilic archaeal viruses are capable of establishing chronic or persistent infection. Only a small portion are exclusively virulent. Halophilic archaeal viruses tend to be lytic but can also by lysogenic. This suggests that a lysogenic life cycle for archaeal viruses may be an adaptation to a harsh environment outside their hosts. Vertical transmission through lysogeny combined with horizontal transmission would be beneficial in the harsh environments archaeal viruses experience outside of their hosts since viruses transmitted horizontally may not find a host. Because of the aforementioned low cell density and rapid half-life, these viruses are more likely to replicate via a chronic or lysogenic lifecycle.

Genomic sequences called "virus and plasmid related elements" (ViPREs) contain viruses and other MGEs like plasmids that integrate into the host genome, forming groups of genes that can move between viruses during recombination. This allows for new viruses to be created through reassortment. This type of recombination has been proposed for why haloarchaeal viruses within Halopanivirales and Pleolipoviridae can have the same core structural proteins but different genomic characteristics and replication methods. There is also evidence that ViPREs are involved in recombination both between viruses and across host species. This enables extensive recombination between viruses, plasmids, and archaea to produce mobile groups of genes from different sources, which may result in rapid evolution of haloarchaeal viruses and their hosts.

=== Co-evolution with hosts ===
Co-evolution of archaea and their viruses has been observed. In methanogenic archaea of the order Methanococcales, the cellular minichromosome maintenance (MCM) helicase has apparently undergone accelerated evolution due to acquisition by a virus, accelerated evolution as a viral gene, and re-integration into the host archaea, replacing the original MCM gene. In other cases, replication proteins encoded by archaeal viruses appear to share common ancestry with their archaeal counterparts, but the exact mechanisms of this are under-explored. The family B polymerase PolB3 of halophilic and methanogenic archaea appears to have been recruited from archaeal caudoviruses.

== Ecology ==
The extent to which archaeal viruses impact their hosts is largely unknown. They are predicted to play a greater role deeper in the ocean and in the subsurface, where virus-to-prokaryote ratios and the quantity of virus-related DNA sequences in metagenomes are greater. There is evidence of high viral-induced mortality, mainly of Nitrososphaerota, in deep-sea ecosystems, resulting in about 0.3–0.5 gigatons of carbon release globally each year. The death of these archaea releases cellular content, thereby enhancing organic matter mineralization and respiration of uninfected heterotrophs. In turn, this stimulates nitrogen regeneration processes, supplying 30–60% of the ammonia required to sustain archaeal chemoautotrophic carbon production in deep-sea sediments. Archaea and bacteria inhabit deep sea sediments in roughly equal numbers, but virus-mediated lysis of archaea occurs at a greater proportion than of bacteria. Archaeal viruses may therefore be a major driver of biogeochemical cycling in the oceans.

All haloarchaeal viruses have shown to withstand a wider range of salinity than their hosts, which may be an evolutionary advantage given to viruses. For some, such as HVTV-1 and HSTV-2, infectivity is salt-dependent, and low salinity can cause reversible inactivation of virions. For other haloarchaeal viruses, such as phiCh1, virus concentrations increase during low salinity when host populations are low. Haloarchaeal viruses His1 and S5100 cause persistent infections when salinities are above the optimal level for their hosts and lyse host cells when salinity is low. This may be a viral strategy to exit host cells when they are stressed and die, or viruses may recognize when hosts are unfit for viral replication, so viral growth and lysis in low salinity would not contribute to selection since hosts die. In these conditions, the virus may benefit from limited host defense evolution and by carrying, preserving, or transferring its DNA to suitable hosts when the archaeal population has recovered.

== Immune system interactions ==
Nearly all archaea possess multiple immune defense systems. CRISPR-Cas in particular is near-ubiquitous, especially in hyperthermophiles, as about 90% of sequenced archaea possess at least one CRISPR-Cas locus in their genome. These loci contain a leader sequence, alternating short identical sequences termed repeats, and variable regions called spacers, which are usually identical to sequences taken from foreign DNA. CRISPRs are transcribed to produce CRISPR-RNA, which can neutralize foreign genetic elements via base complementarity. Immunity to viruses granted from CRISPR-Cas systems is passed down to daughter cells as a form of inherited immunity.

Archaeal viruses can, at least temporarily, avoid the CRISPR-Cas targeting system through changes in the target sequence. Some archaeal viruses carry CRISPR arrays, which likely prevent co-infection of the same cell by other viruses. Archaeal viruses also encode many proteins that modulate specific stages of virus-host interaction, including proteins that inactivate host defense mechanisms like CRISPR-Cas.

== Research ==
Compared to bacterial and eukaryotic viruses, not much is known about archaeal viruses. Areas of interest among archaeal virologists include gaining a better understanding of archaeal virus diversity, how archaeal viruses influence the ecology and evolution of microbial communities, how archaeal viruses interact with their hosts, what functions do genes encoded by archaeal viruses have, and the morphology and replication cycle of archaeal viruses.

Archaea dominate high-temperature, low-pH hot springs worldwide, such as those in Yellowstone National Park, to the point where eukaryotes are absent and bacteria constitute only a small percentage of cellular biomass present. Furthermore, these environments typically have little diversity, with less than ten archaeal species present in any given location. This makes the environment useful for studying how archaeal viruses interact with their hosts in the absence of other microbes. Viruses of mesophilic archaea are relatively unresearched, especially compared to bacterial viruses in these environments.

Most described archaeal viruses were isolated from extreme geothermal and hypersaline environments where archaea are dominant. In contrast, not much is known about archaeal viruses from marine environments, soils, and the human body. In humans, archaea inhabit the oral cavity, skin, and gut, where they comprise about 10% of the human gut anaerobic community. Despite this, no archaea is associated with disease in humans, nor is any archaeal virus known to contribute to disease pathogenesis in humans.

The small number of archaeal viruses identified is due to the difficulty in culturing archaea. Metagenomics has helped overcome this, identifying a large number of viral groups not previously described. In one study, 110 viral groups were identified, only seven of which were described at the time, indicating that only a small portion of viruses of extreme environments have been studied. Most archaeal viruses have been isolated from two of 14 recognized or proposed archaeal phyla, Thermoproteota and "Euryarchaeota", indicating that future discoveries will likely further expand knowledge of archaeal virus diversity. Archaeal viruses can also be identified indirectly through analysis of CRISPR sequences.

Various methods have been used to better understand archaeal virus genes and their interactions with their hosts. Biochemical analysis has been used to compare gene homologs, genetic analysis has been able to show which genes are essential for function, and structural analysis of protein folds has been able to identify archaeal viruses' relation to other viruses through shared structure. Culture-independent methods have also been used, including viral tagging, phage fluorescent in situ hybridization, single cell genomics, and bioinformatic analysis of previously published sequence data. Sulfolobus spindle-shaped virus 1 (SSV1), SIRV2, and STIV have been developed into model systems to study virus-host interactions. Cryogenic electron microscopy (cryo-EM) has helped to analyze structural similarities between viruses, such as showing that lipothrixviruses, rudiviruses, and tristromaviruses encode the same MCP. Gene homology and synteny likewise have been able to show evolutionary relation, such as the relation between halspiviruses and thaspiviruses.

The archaeal homolog of the endosomal sorting complex required for transport (ESCRT) is used by some archaeal viruses, such as STIV and SIRV2, for assembly and exit. ESCRT is used by some eukaryotic viruses, including Ebola, HIV, and Hepatitis B virus to facilitate exiting the host cell. This suggests that viral budding from archaea is similar to budding in eukaryotic viruses and that the proteins involved in ESCRT were present prior to the emergence of eukaryotes. The discovery of new processes in archaeal viruses may therefore provide more insights into their relation with eukaryotic viruses, in particular viruses of Promethearchaeati, an archaeal kingdom that cladistically includes eukaryotes.

== History ==
The first description of an archaeal virus was made by Torsvik and Dundas in 1974 in a Nature paper titled "Bacteriophage of Halobacterium salinarum". This virus, named Hs1, is a caudovirus identified as infecting Halobacterium salinarum, a halophilic archaeon. Viruses of halophilic archaea continued to be identified throughout the 1970s and 1980s. In the 1980s, Wolfram Zillig and his colleagues began isolating viruses from thermophilic archaea of the orders Thermoproteales and Sulfolobales. In total, he and his colleagues would discover and characterize four archaeal virus families: Fuselloviridae, Rudiviridae, Lipothrixviridae, and Guttaviridae. To discover these viruses, Zillig developed the methods used to culture their hosts.

Fuselloviruses were the first independent group of archaeal viruses to be discovered. Initially mistaken for a plasmid in 1982, SSV1 was the first fusellovirus described. SSV1 would become an important model for studying transcription in archaea, contributing to the acceptance of Archaea as a third domain of cellular life. In 2004, turrivirus STIV1 was described, connecting archaeal viruses to bacterial and eukaryotic viruses in what is now the realm Varidnaviria. The bicaudavirus ATV was described in 2005 and was noted for its ability to undergo a morphological change independent of its host cell.

Aeropyrum coil-shaped virus was identified in 2012 as the first spiravirus and the first known ssDNA archaeal virus. Sulfolobus alphaportoglobovirus 1 became the first described portoglobovirus in 2017. Portogloboviruses, along with halopaniviruses, would become important in understanding the evolutionary history of Varidnaviria, as they represent more basal lineages of the realm than previously described varidnaviruses such as turriviruses. Based on cryo-EM structural analysis and other methods, the realm Adnaviria was established in 2020, becoming the only virus realm to exclusively contain archaeal viruses.
