= Virosphere =

Viral part of the biosphere

Virosphere (virus diversity, virus world, global virosphere) was coined to refer to all those places in which viruses are found or which are affected by viruses. However, more recently virosphere has also been used to refer to the pool of viruses that occurs in all hosts and all environments, as well as viruses associated with specific types of hosts (prokaryotic virosphere, archaeal virosphere, invertebrate virosphere), type of genome (RNA virosphere, dsDNA virosphere) or ecological niche (marine virosphere).

== Viral genome diversity ==
The scope of viral genome diversity is enormous compared to cellular life. Cellular life, including all known organisms, has a double stranded DNA genome, whereas viruses have one of at least 7 different types of genetic information, namely dsDNA, ssDNA, dsRNA, ssRNA+, ssRNA-, ssRNA-RT, dsDNA-RT. Each type of genetic information has its specific manner of mRNA synthesis. Baltimore classification is a system providing overview on these mechanisms for each type of genome. Moreover, in contrast to cellular organisms, viruses don't have universally conserved sequences in their genomes to be compared by.

Viral genome size varies approximately 1000 fold. The smallest viruses may consist of only 1–2 kb genome coding for 1 or 2 genes, and this is enough for them to successfully evolve, infect and replicate in its host. The two most basic viral genes are the replicase gene and the capsid protein gene. As soon as a virus has these genes, it represents a biological entity able to evolve and reproduce in cellular life forms. Some viruses may only have a replicase gene and use a capsid gene of other virus, e.g. an endogenous virus. Most viral genomes have a size of around 10-100kb, whereas bacteriophages tend to have larger genomes carrying parts of genome translation machinery genes from their host. In contrast, RNA viruses have smaller genomes, with a maximum of 35kb in a coronavirus. RNA genomes have a higher mutation rate, which is why their genome has to be small enough in order not to harbour too many mutations, which would disrupt the essential genes or their parts. The functions of the vast majority of viral genes remain unknown, and the approaches to study them have to be developed. The total number of viral genes is much higher than the total number of genes of three domains of life all together, which practically means viruses encode most of the genetic diversity on the planet.

== Viral host diversity ==
Viruses are cosmopolites, they are ubiquitous across all known ecosystems and are able to infect every known lineage of cellular life. However, different viruses infect different hosts, and the mechanisms vary across virus types. Viruses are host-specific, as they need to replicate within a host cell. In order to enter the cell, a viral particle needs to interact with a receptor on the surface of its host cell. For the process of replication, many viruses use their own replicases, but for protein synthesis they are dependent on their host cells protein synthesis machinery. Thus, host specificity is a limiting factor for viral reproduction.

Some viruses have an extremely narrow host range and are able to infect only a specific strain of a specific bacterial species, whereas others are able to infect hundreds or even thousands of different hosts. For example, cucumber mosaic virus (CMV) can use more than 1000 different plant species as a host. Members of viral families like Rhabdoviridae infect hosts from different kingdoms, e.g. plants and vertebrates. Members of the genera Psimunavirus and Myohalovirus infect hosts from different domains of life, e.g. bacteria and archaea.

== Viral capsid diversity ==
The capsid is the outer protecting shell or scaffold of a viral genome. Capsids enclosing viral nucleic acid make up a viral particle or a virion. Capsids are made of proteins, and sometimes have a lipid layer harboured from the host cell while exiting it. Capsid proteins are highly symmetrical and assemble within a host cell by their own due to the fact that assembled capsids are in a more thermodynamically favourable state than separate randomly floating proteins. The most viral capsids have icosahedral or helical symmetry, whereas bacteriophages have a complex structure consisting of an icosahedral head and a helical tail, including a baseplate and fibers important for host cell recognition and penetration. Archeal viruses, that infect hosts living in extreme environments like boiling water, highly saline or acidic environments, have totally different capsid shapes and structures. The variety of capsid structures of Archaeal viruses includes lemon-shaped viruses Bicaudaviridae and Salterprovirus, spindle-shaped Fuselloviridae, bottle-shaped Ampullaviridae, and egg-shaped Guttaviridae.

The capsid size of a virus differs dramatically depending on its genome size and capsid type. Icosahedral capsids are measured by diameter, whereas helical and complex capsids are measured by length and diameter. Viruses differ in capsid size in a spectrum from 10 to more than 1000 nm. The smallest viruses are ssRNA viruses like Parvoviruses. They have an icosahedral capsid approximately 14 nm in diameter, whereas the biggest currently known viruses are the Pithovirus, Mamavirus and Pandoravirus. The Pithovirus is a flask-shaped virus that is 1500 nm long and 500 nm in diameter, the Pandoravirus is an oval-shaped virus that is 1000nm long, and the Mamavirus is an icosahedral virus reaching approximately 500 nm in diameter. An example of how capsid size depends on the size of viral genome can be shown by comparing icosahedral viruses - the smallest viruses are 15-30 nm in diameter, and have genomes in the range of 5 to 15 kb (kilo bases or kilo base pairs depending on the type of genome), and the biggest are near 500 nm in diameter and their genomes are also the largest, they exceed 1 Mb (million base pairs).

== Viral evolution ==
Viral evolution or evolution of viruses presumably started from the beginning of the second age of the RNA world, when different types of viral genomes arose through the transition from RNA- RT –DNA, which also emphasises that viruses played a critical role in the emergence of DNA. The abundance and variety of viral genes also implies that their origin predates LUCA. As viruses do not share unifying common genes, they are considered to be polyphyletic or having multiple origins as opposed to one common origin, as all cellular life forms have. Virus evolution is more complex as it is highly prone to horizontal gene transfer, genetic recombination and reassortment. Moreover, viral evolution should always be considered a process of co-evolution with its host, as a host cell is inevitable for virus reproduction and hence, evolution.

== Viral abundance ==
Viruses are the most abundant biological entities, there are around 10^31 viruses on Earth. Viruses are capable of infecting all organisms on earth, and they are able to survive in much harsher environments than any cellular lifeform. As viruses cannot be included in the tree of life, there is no separate structure illustrating viral diversity and evolutionary relationships. However, viral ubiquity can be imagined as a virosphere covering the whole tree of life.

Genome sequencing technologies including high-throughput methods allow relatively rapid and inexpensive sequencing of environmental samples. The vast majority of the sequences from any environment, both from wild nature and human-made, are new reservoirs. The classic methods like viral culture used previously allowed to observe physical virions or viral particles using electron microscopes allow the gathering of information about their physical and molecular properties.

== See also ==
- Virus
- Virology
- Virome
- Viral evolution
- Virus classification
- List of virus families and subfamilies
- List of virus genera
- List of virus species
