= David Prangishvili =

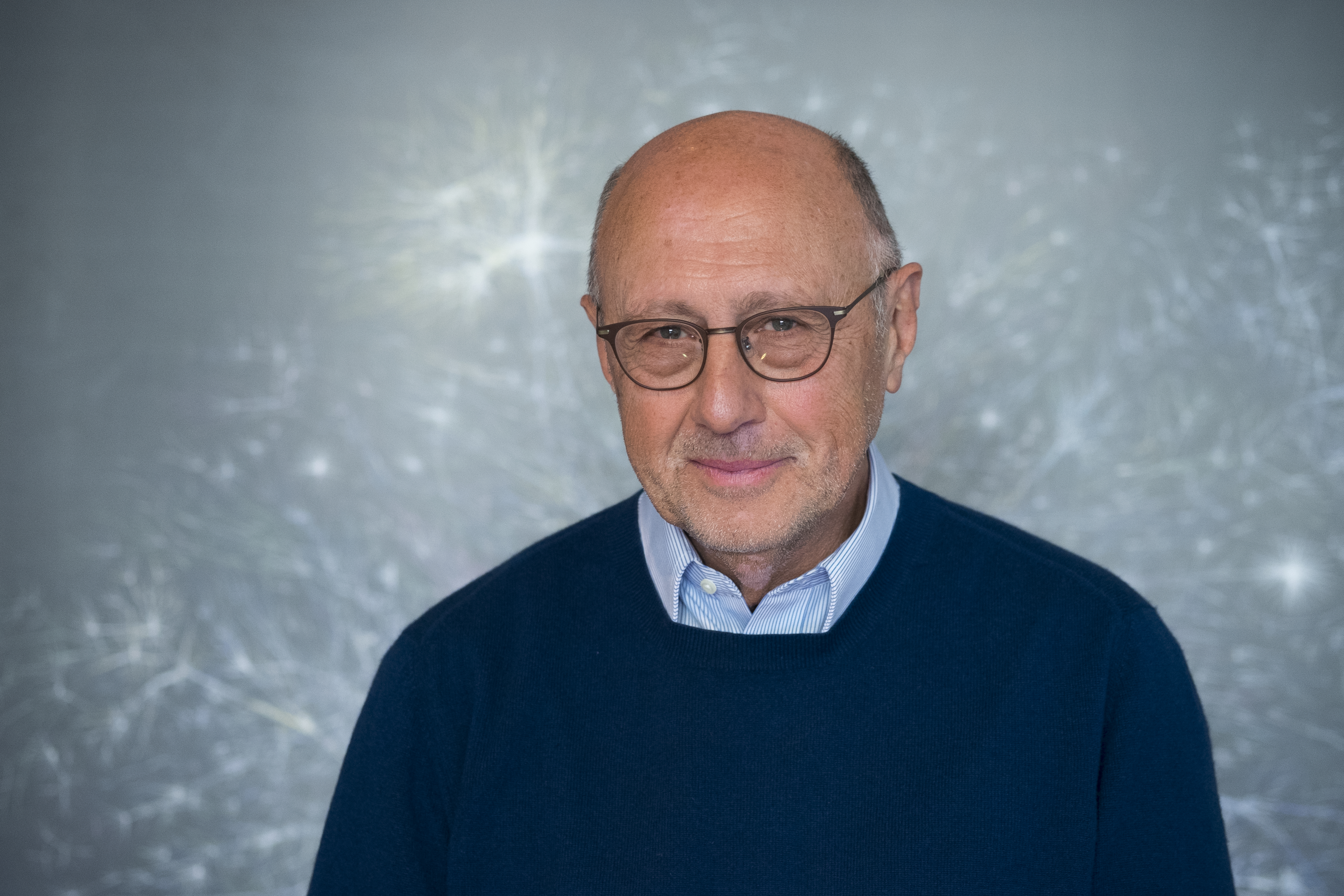
David Prangishvili

David Prangishvili (born 1948) is a virologist, Professor at the Pasteur Institute of Paris, and foremost authority on viruses infecting Archaea.

== Biography ==
David Prangishvili gained a Master of Science degree in 1971 at Tbilisi State University, Georgia, and a PhD (1977) and Habilitation (1989) from Institute of Molecular Biology of the USSR Academy of Sciences, Moscow. He pioneered research on Archaea, the third domain of life, in the USSR and in 1986-1991 was a head of the department of Molecular Biology of Archaea at the Georgian Academy of Sciences, Tbilisi. In 1991-2004 he has worked in Germany, at Max-Planck Institute for Biochemistry and at Regensburg University. Since 2004 he is working at the Pasteur Institute of Paris.

David Prangishvili received a prize of Council of Ministers of the USSR for Excellence in Science and Technology in 1979. David Prangishvili has been elected Member of the Academia Europaea (2018), Member of the European Academy of Microbiology (2015), Foreign Member of the Georgian National Academy of Sciences (2011), visiting professor of Chinese Academy of Sciences (2015).

== Works ==
David Prangishvili has affected the field of prokaryotic virology by the discovery and description of many new species and families of DNA viruses which infect Archaea, encompassing families Ampullaviridae (1), Bicaudaviridae (2), Clavaviridae (3), Globuloviridae (4), Guttaviridae (5), Spiraviridae (6) Tristromaviridae (7), and Portogloboviridae (8), and the order Ligamenvirales (9) (families Rudiviridae (10) and Lipothrixviridae (11) ). He is an author of more than 170 publications in scientific journals and books. Prangishvili’s studies have helped to reveal that DNA viruses of Archaea constitute a distinctive part of the viral world and that Archaea can be infected by viruses with a variety of unusual morphologies which have not been observed among viruses from the other two domains of life, Bacteria and Eukarya. The results of his research provide new perspectives concerning the diversity and evolution of viruses and virus-host interactions. (12-14)

== Publications ==
1. Häring M., Rachel R, Peng X, Garrett RA, and Prangishvili D (2005) “Diverse viruses in hot springs of Pozzuoli, Italy, including a unique bottle-shaped archaeal virus ABV from a new family, the Ampullaviridae”. J Virol 147: 2419-2429.

2. Häring M, Vestergaard G, Rachel R, Chen L, Garrett RA and Prangishvili D (2005) “Independent virus development outside a host”. Nature 436: 1101-1102.

3. Mochizuki T, Yoshida T, Tanaka R, Forterre P, Sakob Y, and Prangishvili D (2010) “Diversity of viruses of the hyperthermophilic archaeal genus Aeropyrum, and isolation of the Aeropyrum pernix bacilliform virus 1, APBV1, the first representative of the family Clavaviridae”. Virology 402: 347-354.

4. Häring M, Peng X, Brügger K, Rachel R, Stetter KO, Garrett RA, and Prangishvili D (2004) “Morphology and genome organization of the virus PSV of the hyperthermophilic archaeal genera Pyrobaculum and Thermoproteus: a novel virus family, the Globuloviridae”. Virology 323: 233–242.

5. Mochizuki T, Sako Y, and Prangishvili D (2011) "Provirus induction in hyperthermophilic Archaea: Characterization of Aeropyrum pernix spindle-shaped virus 1 and Aeropyrum pernix ovoid virus 1". J Bacteriol 193:5412-5419.

6. Mochizuki T, Krupovic M, Pehau-Arnaudet G, Sako Y, Forterre P, and Prangishvili D (2012). "Archaeal virus with exceptional virion architecture and the largest single-stranded DNA genome". Proc Natl Acad Sci USA 109: 13386–13391.

7. Rensen E, Mochizuki T, Quemin E, Schouten S, Krupovic M, and Prangishvili D (2016) “Novel virus of hyperthermophilic archaea with a unique architecture among DNA viruses”. Proc Nat. Acad Sci USA 113: 2478-2483.

8. Liu Y, Ishino S, Ishino Y, Pehau-Arnaudet G, Krupovic M, and Prangishvili D (2017) “A novel type of polyhedral viruses infecting hyperthermophilic archaea”. J Virol. 91: e00589-17.

9. Prangishvili D, and Krupovic M (2012). “A new proposed taxon for double-stranded DNA viruses, the order Ligamenvirales”. Arch Virol 157: 791–795.

10. Prangishvili D, Arnold HP, Götz D, Ziese U, Holz I, Kristjansson JK and Zillig W (1999) “A novel virus family, the Rudiviridae: Structure, virus-host interactions and genome variability of the Sulfolobus viruses SIRV1 and SIRV2”. Genetics 152:1387–1396.

11. Bettstetter M, Peng, X, Garrett RA, and Prangishvili D (2003) “AFV1, a novel virus infecting hyperthermophilic archaea of the genus Acidianus”. Virology 315: 68-79.

12. Prangishvili D. (2013) “The wonderful world of archaeal viruses”. Annu Rev Microbiol 67: 565-585.

13 Prangishvili D (2015) “Archaeal viruses: living fossils of the ancient virosphere?” Ann NY Acad Sci 1341: 35-40.

14. Prangishvili D, Bamford DH, Forterre P, Iranzo J., Koonon EV, and Krupovic M (2017) “The enigmatic archaeal virosphere”. Nature Rev Microbiol 15: 724–739.
