= Filociclovir =

Chemical compound

Legal status
- Legal status: US: Investigational New Drug

Identifiers
- IUPAC name: 2-amino-9-[(Z)-[2,2-bis(hydroxymethyl)cyclopropylidene]methyl]-1H-purin-6-one
- CAS Number: 632325-71-4
- PubChem CID: 135409256
- ChemSpider: 2276035
- UNII: EAO0TD9B13
- KEGG: D10632
- CompTox Dashboard (EPA): DTXSID10212612

Chemical and physical data
- Formula: C_{11}H_{13}N_{5}O_{3}
- Molar mass: 263.257 g·mol^{−1}
- 3D model (JSmol): Interactive image
- SMILES: C1/C(=C/N2C=NC3=C2N=C(NC3=O)N)/C1(CO)CO
- InChI: InChI=1S/C11H13N5O3/c12-10-14-8-7(9(19)15-10)13-5-16(8)2-6-1-11(6,3-17)4-18/h2,5,17-18H,1,3-4H2,(H3,12,14,15,19)/b6-2-; Key:KMUNHOKTIVSFRA-KXFIGUGUSA-N

Filociclovir (cyclopropavir, MBX-400) is an antiviral drug which was developed for the treatment of cytomegalovirus infection and also shows some activity against other double-stranded DNA viruses. It has reached Phase II human clinical trials.
