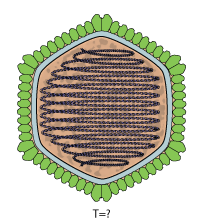
- Portoglobovirus virion

Virus classification
- (unranked): Virus
- Realm: Varidnaviria (?)
- Family: Portogloboviridae

= Portogloboviridae =

Family of viruses

Portogloboviridae is a family of dsDNA viruses that infect archaea. It is a proposed family of the realm Varidnaviria, but ICTV officially puts it as incertae sedis virus. Viruses in the family are related to Helvetiavirae. The capsid proteins of these viruses and their characteristics are of evolutionary importance for the origin of the other Varidnaviria viruses since they seem to retain primordial characters.

== Description ==
The virions in this family have a capsid with icosahedral geometry and a viral envelope that protects the genetic material. The diameter is 83 to 87 nanometers. The genome is circular dsDNA with a length of 20,222 base pairs. The genome contains 45 open reading frames (ORFs), which are closely arranged and occupy 89.1% of the genome. ORFs are generally short, with an average length of 103 codons. Virions have 10 proteins ranging from 20 to 32 kDa. Of these proteins, 8 code for the capsid and two for the viral envelope, including one that is a vertical single jelly roll (SJR) capsid protein. Entry into the host cell is by penetration. Viral replication occurs by chronic infection without a lytic cycle.

The Portogloboviridae viruses together with Halopanivirales have evolutionary importance in the evolution of the other Varidnaviria viruses since they appear to be relics of how the first viruses of this realm were. Portogloboviridae together with Halopanivirales may have infected the last universal common ancestor (LUCA) and originated before that organism.

It has been proposed that it may be related to the origin of Varidnaviria in the following way.

- Varidnaviria
  - Portogloboviridae
  - - Helvetiavirae
    - Bamfordvirae

== Taxonomy ==
The family has one genus which has two species:

- Alphaportoglobovirus
  - Alphaportoglobovirus beppuense
  - Alphaportoglobovirus umijigokuense

Name	Name	Abbr	GenBank	REFSEQ
Alphaportoglobovirus beppuense	Sulfolobus polyhedral virus 1	SPV1	KY780159	NC_038017
Alphaportoglobovirus umijigokuense	Sulfolobus polyhedral virus 2	SPV2	MK064567	NC_055116
