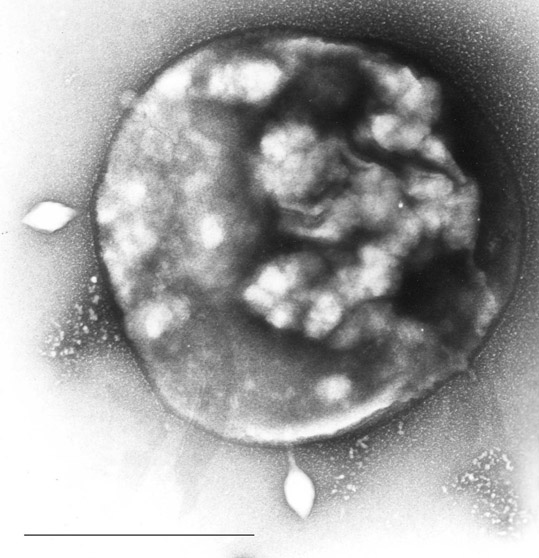
- Electron micrograph of Sulfolobus infected with Sulfolobus virus STSV1. Bar = 1 μm.

Virus classification
- Group: Group I (dsDNA)
- Order: Unassigned
- Family: Bicaudaviridae
- Genus: not assigned
- Species: Sulfolobus tengchongensis spindle-shaped virus 1

= Sulfolobus tengchongensis spindle-shaped virus =

Species of virus

Sulfolobus tengchongensis spindle-shaped virus 1 (STSV1) is a DNA virus of the family Bicaudaviridae. It infects the hyperthermophilic archaeon Sulfolobus tengchongensis which can be found in the volcanic area of Tengchong, Baoshan City, in western Yunnan province, People's Republic of China.

In 2014, Sulfolobus tengchongensis spindle-shaped virus 2 (STSV2), a relative of STSV1, also infecting S. tengchongensis, has been reported. Besides S. tengchongensis, STSV2 infects Sulfolobus islandicus REY15A. It has been demonstrated that STSV2 induces unprecedented gigantism of S. islandicus cells by blocking the expression of the cell division genes and arresting the cell cycle in the S phase. The diameter of infected cells increases up to 20 times, resulting in 8,000-fold increase in volume compared to noninfected cells.
