= Hukuchivirus =

Virus classification
- (unranked): Virus
- Realm: Singelaviria
- Kingdom: Helvetiavirae
- Phylum: Dividoviricota
- Class: Laserviricetes
- Order: Halopanivirales
- Family: Matshushitaviridae
- Genus: Hukuchivirus

Genus of viruses

Hukuchivirus is a genus of double-stranded DNA viruses that infect thermophilic bacteria. The genus was previously named Gammasphaerolipovirus.

== Taxonomy ==
The genus contains the following species:

- Hukuchivirus IN93 (formerly Thermus thermophilus phage IN93 (2014), Thermus virus IN93 (2015-2019))
- Hukuchivirus P2377 (formerly Thermus thermophilus bacteriophage P23-77 (2014), Thermus virus P23-77 (2015-2019, type species), H. P23-77 (2020))

== Morphology ==
The virus particle, called a virion, of viruses in the genus has a capsid that is icosahedral in shape. The capsid contains an internal lipid membrane between the capsid and the genome, which is in the center of the virion.
