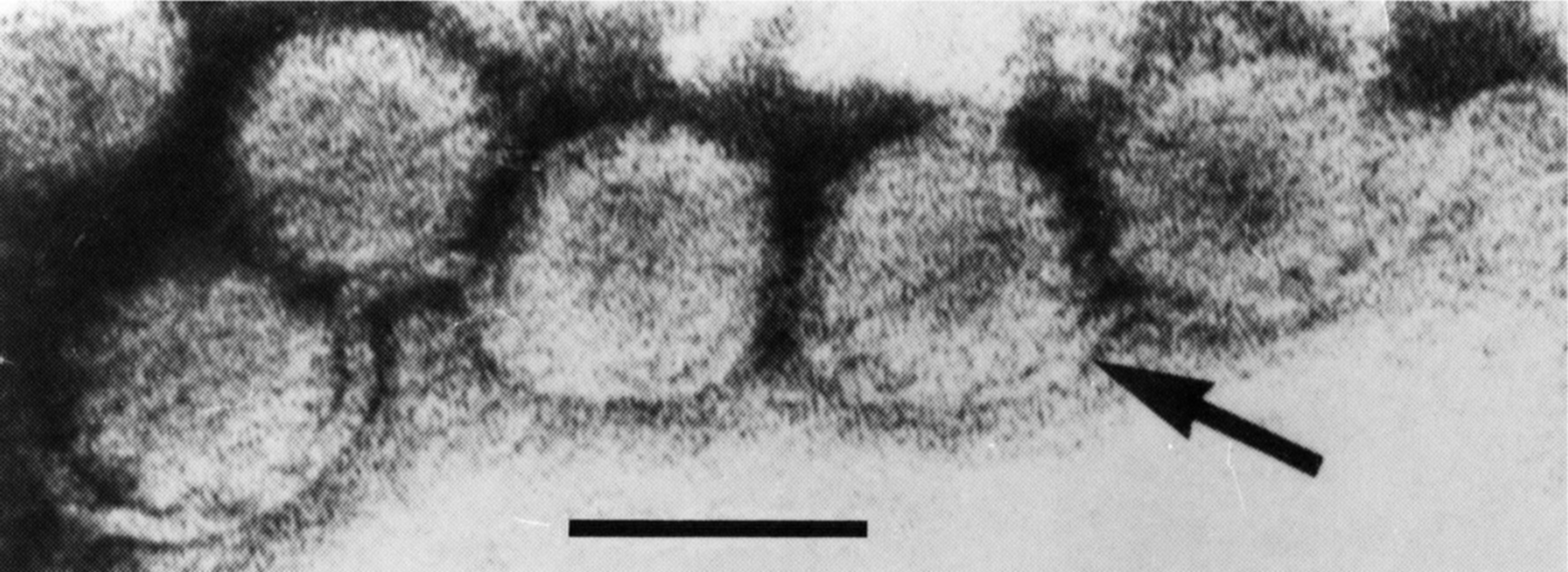
- Rhizidiomyces virus

Virus classification
- (unranked): Virus
- Genus: Rhizidiovirus

Species
- Rhizidiomyces virus ICTV 1987

Synonyms
- Rhizidiomyces virus: RV Virus name abbr.

= Rhizidiovirus =

Genus of viruses

Rhizidiovirus is a genus of viruses. Stramenopiles (specifically Hyphochytridiomycota) serve as natural hosts. There is only one species in this genus: Rhizidiomyces virus.

== Structure ==
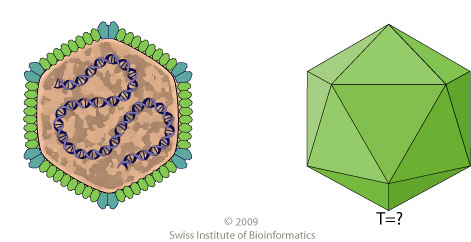
Schematic drawing of a Rhizidiovirus particle

Viruses in Rhizidiovirus are non-enveloped, with icosahedral, round, and isometric geometries. The diameter is around 60 nm.

The genome is non segmented, linear double stranded DNA (dsDNA) and ~25.5 kilobases in length. It encodes at least 14 protein with molecular weights between 84.5 and 26 kilodaltons.

== Life cycle ==
The virus seems to remain latent within the host until the host is stressed.

DNA-templated transcription is the method of transcription. Fungi and hyphochytridiomycota serve as the natural host.
