= Jelly roll fold =

Type of beta barrel protein domain structure

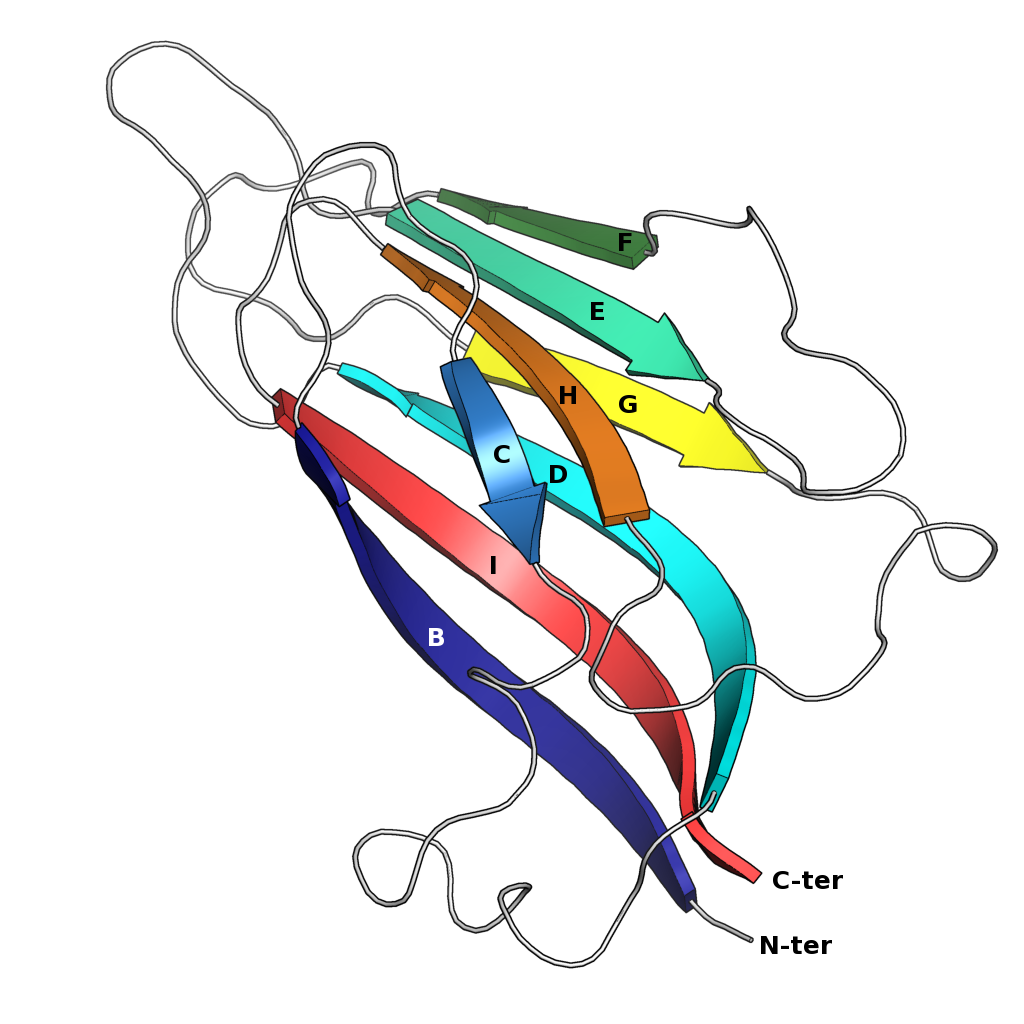
A canonical example of a jelly roll viral capsid protein, from the satellite tobacco mosaic virus. The individual beta strands are labeled with their traditional designations (for historical reasons, sheet A is not used), highlighting the packing of the BIDG and CHEF four-stranded sheets.

The jelly roll or Swiss roll fold is a protein fold or supersecondary structure composed of eight beta strands arranged in two four-stranded sheets. The name of the structure was introduced by Jane S. Richardson in 1981, reflecting its resemblance to the jelly or Swiss roll cake. The fold is an elaboration on the Greek key motif and is sometimes considered a form of beta barrel. It is very common in viral proteins, particularly viral capsid proteins. Taken together, the jelly roll and Greek key structures comprise around 30% of the all-beta proteins annotated in the Structural Classification of Proteins (SCOP) database.

== Structure ==
The basic jelly roll structure consists of eight beta strands arranged in two four-stranded antiparallel beta sheets which pack together across a hydrophobic interface [Where citation... uniprot]. The strands are traditionally labeled B through I for the historical reason that the first solved structure, of a jelly roll capsid protein from the tomato bushy stunt virus, had an additional strand A outside the fold's common core. The sheets are composed of strands BIDG and CHEF, folded such that strand B packs opposite strand C, I opposite H, etc.

== Viral proteins ==
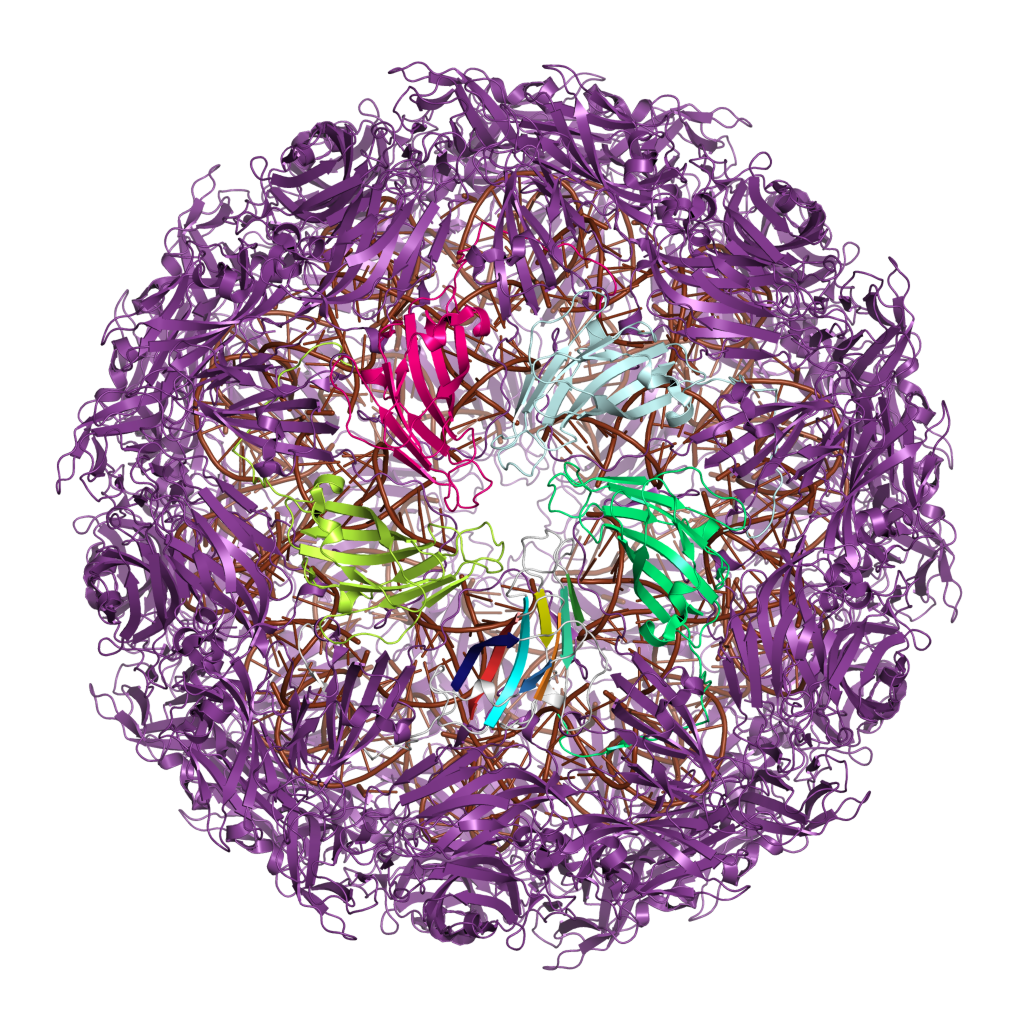
The full assembled capsid structure of the satellite tobacco mosaic virus, with the monomer shown above at the bottom of the highlighted pentamer. The remainder of the protein chains are shown in purple and the RNA in the interior of the capsid is shown in brown. The axis of the jelly roll in this single jelly roll capsid is parallel to the capsid surface. From PDB: 4OQ9.

A large number of viruses build their exterior capsids from proteins containing either a single or a double jelly roll fold. This shared capsid architecture is thought to reflect ancient evolutionary relationships, possibly dating to before the last universal common ancestor (LUCA) of cellular life. Other viral lineages use evolutionarily unrelated proteins to build their enclosed capsids, which likely evolved independently at least twice and possibly many times, with links to proteins of cellular origin.

=== Single jelly roll capsid proteins ===
Single jelly roll capsid (JRC) proteins are found in at least sixteen distinct viral families, mostly with icosahedral capsid structures and including both RNA viruses and DNA viruses. Many viruses with single jelly roll capsids are positive-sense single-stranded RNA viruses. Two groups of double-stranded DNA viruses with single-JRC capsids are the Papillomaviridae and Polyomaviridae, both of which have fairly small capsids; in these viruses, the architecture of the assembled capsid orients the axis of the jelly roll parallel or "horizontally" relative to the capsid surface. A large-scale analysis of viral capsid components suggested that the single horizontal jelly roll is the most common fold among capsid proteins, accounting for about 28% of known examples.

Another group of viruses uses single jelly roll proteins in their capsids, but in the vertical rather than horizontal orientation. These viruses are evolutionarily related to the large group of double jelly-roll viruses known as the PRD1-adenovirus viral lineage, with similar capsid architecture realized through assembly of two distinct single jelly-roll major capsid proteins expressed from distinct genes. These single vertical jelly-roll viruses comprise the taxon Helvetiavirae. Known viruses with vertical single jelly roll capsids infect extremophilic prokaryotes.

=== Double jelly roll proteins ===
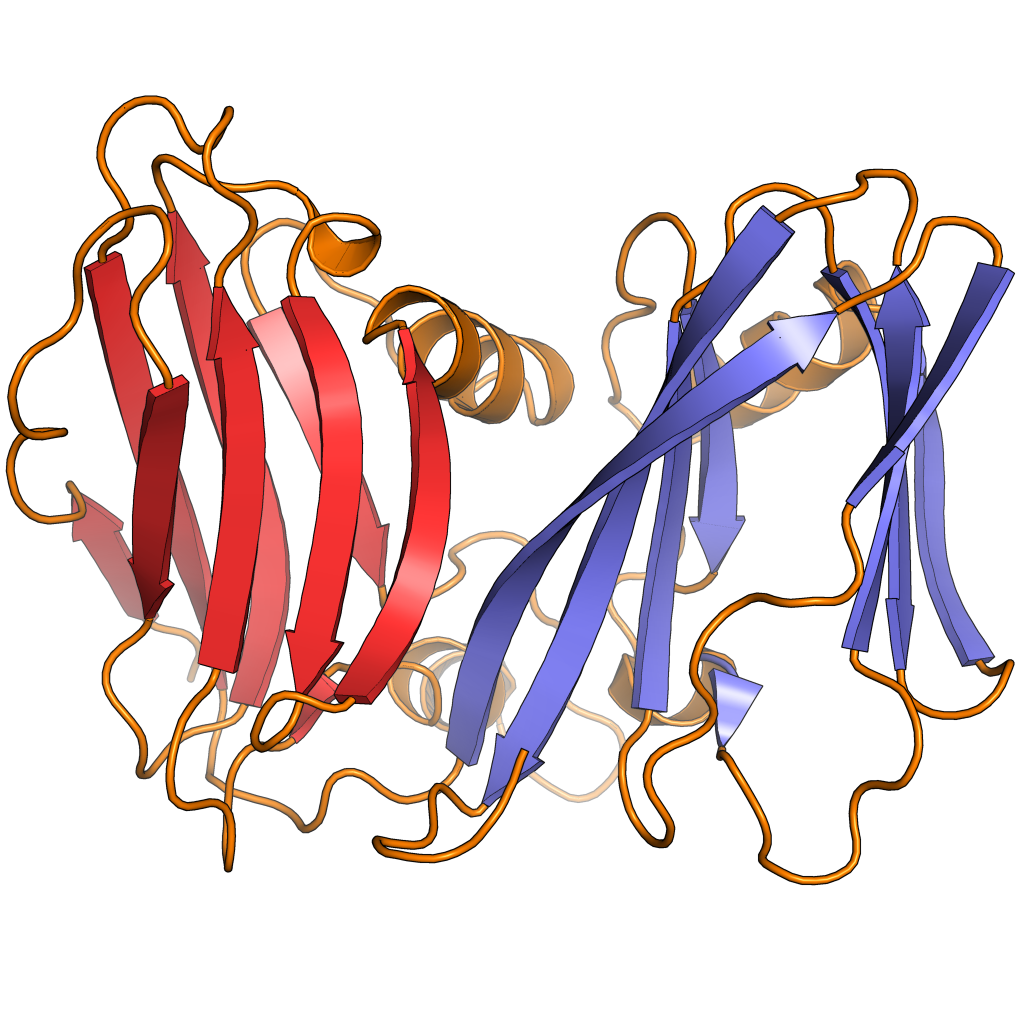
A monomer of the double jelly roll major capsid protein P2 from bacteriophage PM2. The two distinct jelly roll domains are shown in red and blue, with the remaining protein sequence in orange. Double jelly rolls are oriented with the "vertical" axis perpendicular to the capsid surface, which is at the bottom in this image. From PDB: 2W0C.

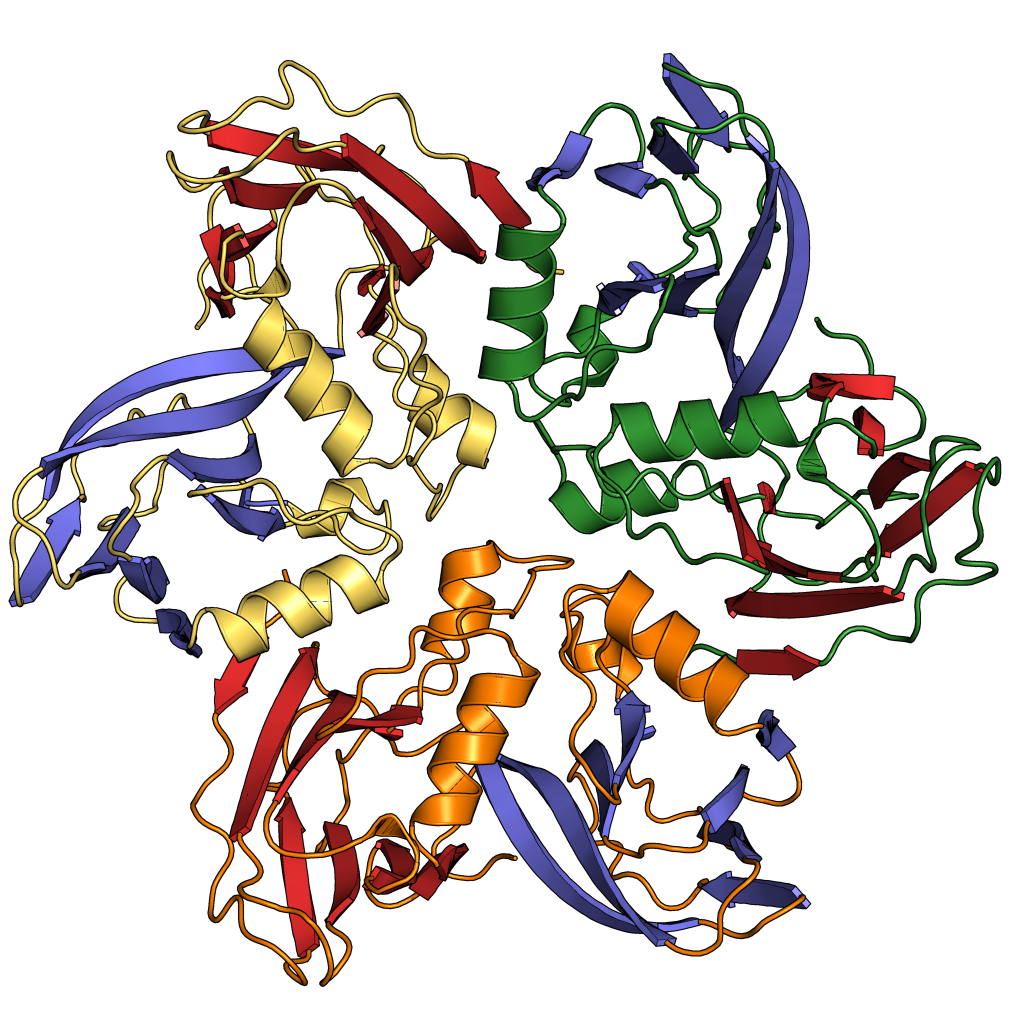
A pseudohexameric trimer of double jelly roll proteins; the jelly rolls are in red and blue and the loops and helices are colored to distinguish the three monomers in the assembly. The viewer is looking down from the exterior toward the capsid surface. From PDB: 2W0C.

Double jelly roll capsid proteins consist of two single jelly roll folds connected by a short linker region. They are found in both double-stranded DNA viruses and single-stranded DNA viruses of at least ten different viral families, including viruses that infect all domains of life, and spanning a large capsid size range. In the double jelly roll capsid architecture, the jelly roll axis is oriented perpendicular or "vertically" relative to the capsid surface.

Double jelly roll proteins are believed to have evolved from single jelly roll proteins by gene duplication. It is likely that vertical single jelly roll viruses represent a transitional form, and that the vertical and horizontal jelly roll capsid proteins have independent evolutionary origins from ancestral cellular proteins. The degree of structural similarity among double-jelly-roll virus capsids has led to the conclusion that these viruses likely have a common evolutionary origin despite their diversity in size and in host range; this has become known as the PRD1-adenovirus lineage (Bamfordvirae). Many members of this group have been identified through metagenomics and in some cases have few to no other viral genes in common. Although most members of this group have icosahedral capsid geometry, a few families such as the Poxviridae and Ascoviridae have oval or brick-shaped mature virions; poxviruses such as Vaccinia undergo dramatic conformational changes mediated by highly derived double jelly roll proteins during maturation and likely derive from an icosahedral ancestor. Shared double-jelly-roll capsid proteins, along with other homologous proteins, have also been cited in support of the proposed order Megavirales containing the nucleocytoplasmic large DNA viruses (NCLDV).

Initially, it was believed that double jelly roll proteins are unique to viruses, because they were not observed in cellular proteins. However, in 2022, comparison of protein structures revealed several families of bona fide cellular proteins with the double jelly roll fold

=== Non-capsid proteins ===
Single jelly rolls also occur in non-capsid viral proteins, including minor components of the assembled virion as well as non-virion proteins such as polyhedrin. In plant viruses, the 30K superfamily movement proteins responsible for intercellular transport of viral genomes or entire capsids through plasmodesmata channels have the single jelly-roll fold and have evolved from the capsid proteins of small icosahedral viruses.

== Cellular proteins ==
Both single and double jelly roll folds are found in proteins of cellular origin. One class of cellular proteins with single jelly roll fold is the nucleoplasmins, which serve as molecular chaperone proteins for histone assembly into nucleosomes. The N-terminal domain of nucleoplasmins possesses a single jelly roll fold and assembled into a pentamer. Similar structures have since been reported in additional groups of chromatin remodeling proteins. Jelly roll motifs with identical beta-sheet connectivity are also found in tumor necrosis factor ligands and proteins from the bacterium Yersinia pseudotuberculosis that belong to a class of viral and bacterial proteins known as superantigens.

More broadly, the members of the extremely diverse cupin superfamily are also often described as jelly rolls; though the common core of the cupin domain structure contains only six beta strands, many cupins have eight. Examples include the non-heme dioxygenase enzymes (including alpha-ketoglutarate-dependent hydroxylases) and JmjC-family histone demethylases.

Cellular proteins with the double jelly roll fold include glycoside hydrolases of the DUF2961 family, peptide:N-glycosidase F (PNGases F) and peptidylglycine alpha-amidating monooxygenase.

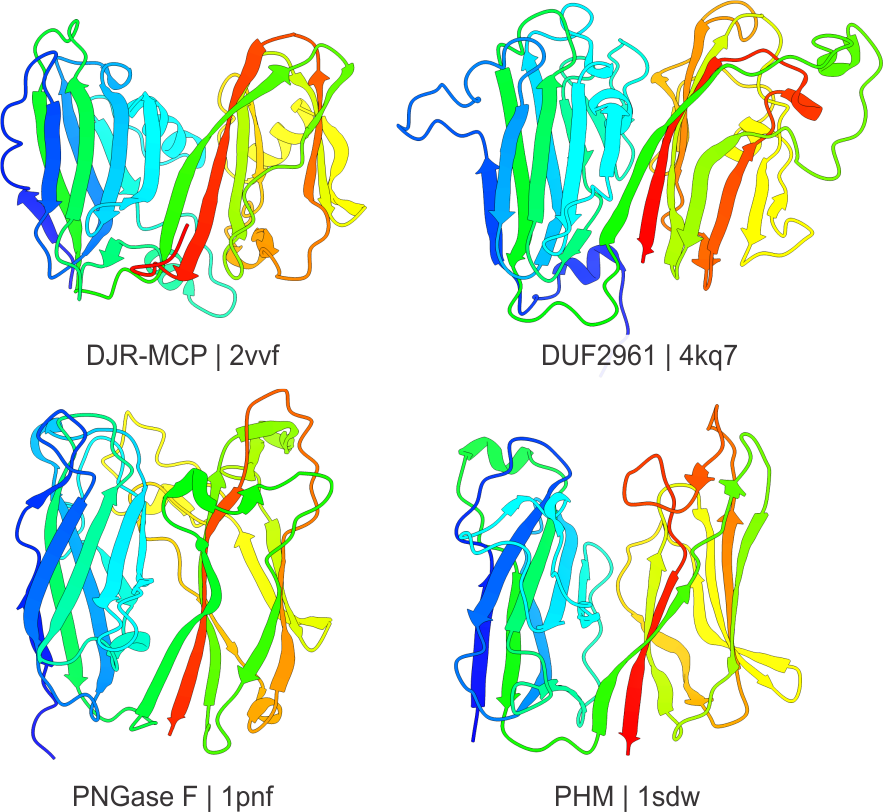

A notable difference between PNGases F and the other double jelly roll proteins is the absence of the α-helices, which follow the F and F' strands in capsid proteins and DUF2961. The equivalent regions are variable in the PNGases F and contain either long loops or insertions. By contrast, jelly-roll domains of DUF2961 proteins contain an insertion of short β-hairpins upstream of the G and G' strands of the double jelly roll fold. Importantly, DUF2961 family proteins form trimers resembling viral capsomers.

== Evolution ==
Comparative studies of proteins classified as jelly roll and Greek key structures suggest that the Greek key proteins evolved significantly earlier than their more topologically complex jelly roll counterparts. Structural bioinformatics studies comparing virus capsid jelly-roll proteins to other proteins of known structure indicates that the capsid proteins form a well-separated cluster, suggesting that they are subject to a distinctive set of evolutionary constraints. One of the most notable features of viral capsid jelly roll proteins is their ability to form oligomers in a repeated tiling pattern to produce a closed protein shell; the cellular proteins that are most similar in fold and topology are mostly also oligomers. It has been proposed that viral jelly-roll capsid proteins have evolved from cellular jelly-roll proteins, potentially on several independent occasions, at the earliest stages of cellular evolution.

== History and nomenclature ==
The name "jelly roll" was first used for the structure composed of an elaboration on the Greek key motif by Jane S. Richardson in 1981 and was intended to reflect the structure's resemblance to a jelly or Swiss roll cake. The structure has been given a variety of descriptive names, including a wedge, beta barrel, and beta roll. The edges of the two sheets do not meet to form regular hydrogen bonding patterns, and so it is often not considered to be a true beta barrel, though the term is in common use in describing viral capsid architecture. Cellular proteins containing jelly roll-like structures may be described as a cupin fold, a JmjC fold, or a double-stranded beta helix.
