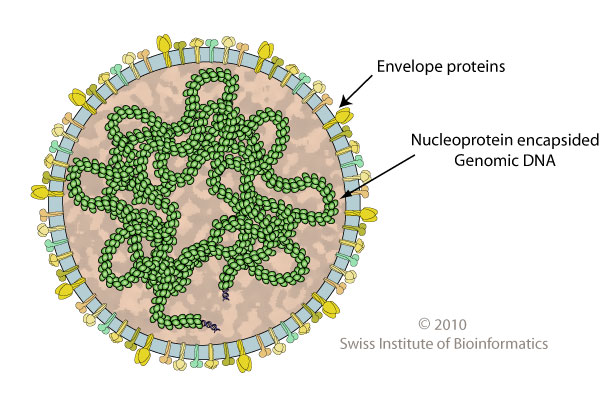

Virus classification
- (unranked): Virus
- Family: Globuloviridae

Genera
- Alphaglobulovirus

= Globuloviridae =

Family of viruses

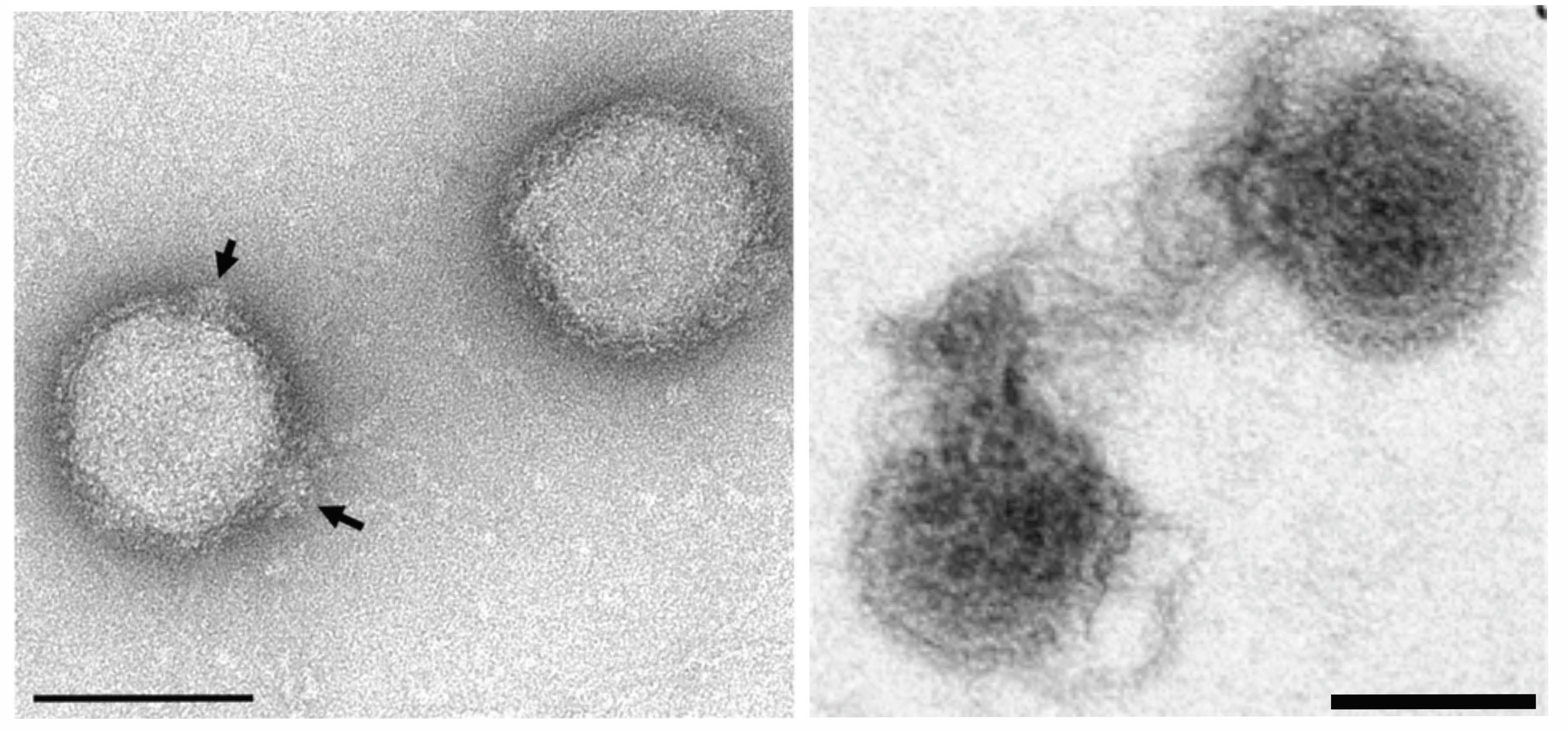
Negative-contrast electron micrographs of virions of Pyrobaculum spherical virus (PSV, genus Alphaglobulovirus). (Left) Intact virions; arrows indicate spherical protrusions. (Right) Partially disrupted virions extruding disordered nucleoprotein core. The bars represent 100 nm. Modified from (Häring et al., 2004; provided by ICTV).

Globuloviridae is a family of hyperthermophilic archaeal viruses. Crenarchaea of the genera Pyrobaculum and Thermoproteus (both in Thermoproteaceae) serve as natural hosts. There are four species in this family, assigned to a single genus, Alphaglobulovirus.

== Taxonomy ==
The family contains one genus which contains four species:

- Alphaglobulovirus
  - Alphaglobulovirus cinderense, Thermoproteus tenax spherical virus 1
  - Alphaglobulovirus obsidianense, Pyrobaculum spherical virus
  - Alphaglobulovirus pozzuoliense, Pyrobaculum spherical virus 2
  - Alphaglobulovirus sileriense, Thermoproteus spherical piliferous virus 1

== Structure ==
Virions in the Globuloviridae are spherical and enveloped. The diameter is around 100 nm.

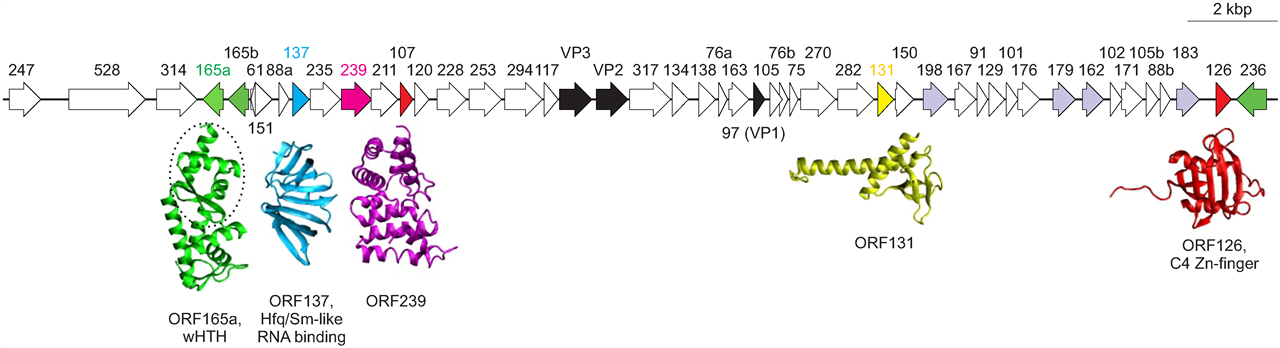
Genome organization of Pyrobaculum spherical virus (PSV) showing location, sizes and direction of putative genes.

Genomes are linear dsDNA and non-segmented, around 20–30kb in length.

Genus	Structure	Symmetry	Capsid	Genomic arrangement	Genomic segmentation
Alphaglobulovirus	Spherical		Enveloped	Linear	Monopartite

== Life cycle ==
Viral replication is cytoplasmic. DNA-templated transcription is the method of transcription. Pyrobaculum and Thermoproteus archaea serve as the natural host. Transmission routes are passive diffusion.

Genus	Host details	Tissue tropism	Entry details	Release details	Replication site	Assembly site	Transmission
Alphaglobulovirus	Pyrobaculum and Thermoproteus archaea	None	Injection	Budding	Cytoplasm	Cytoplasm	Passive diffusion
