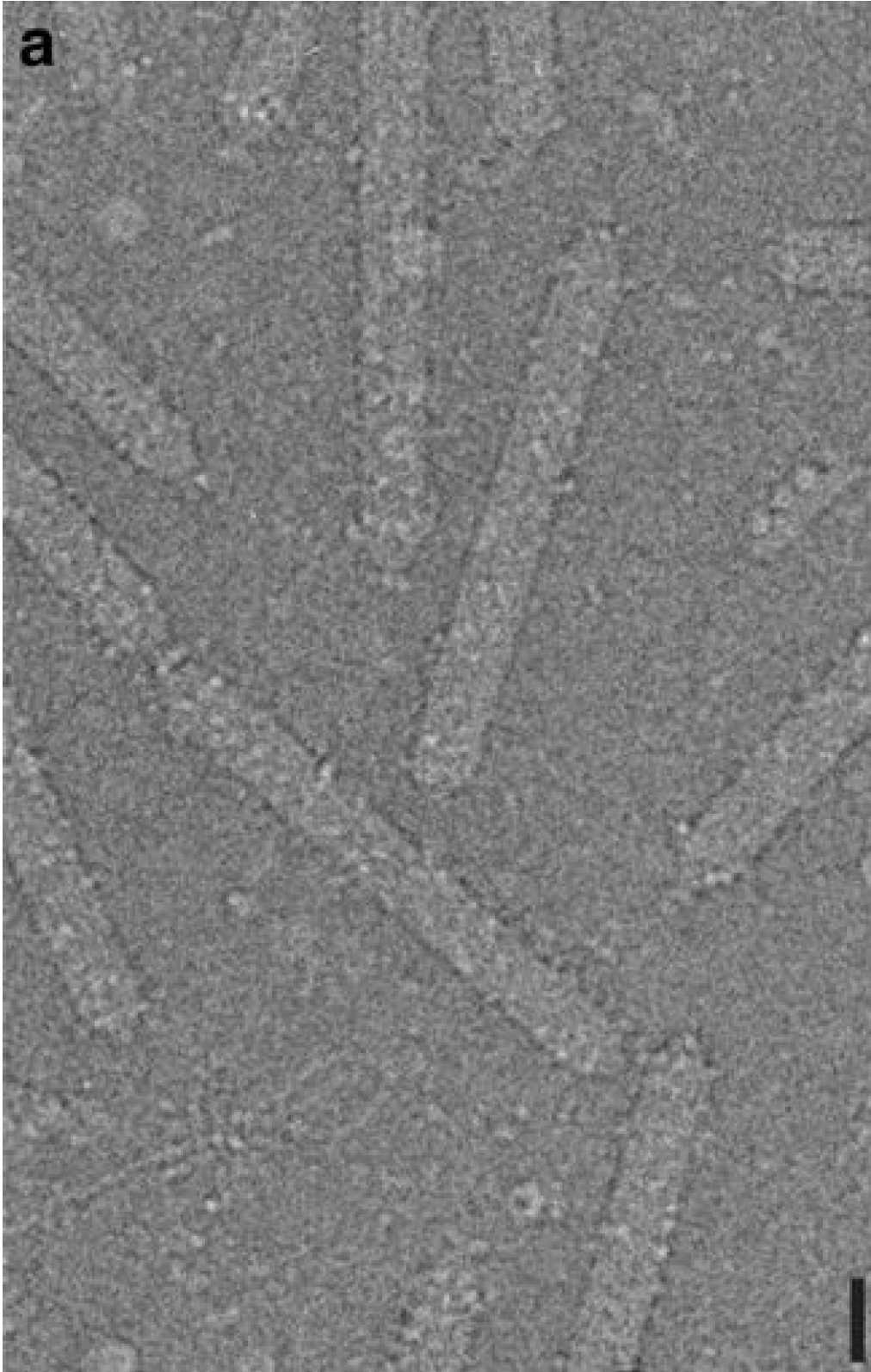
- Aeropyrum pernix bacilliform virus 1 (APBV1)

Virus classification
- (unranked): Virus
- Family: Clavaviridae
- Genus: Clavavirus

Species
- Clavavirus yamagawaense

= Clavaviridae =

Family of viruses

Clavaviridae is a family of double-stranded viruses that infect archaea. This family was first described by the team led by D. Prangishvili in 2010. There is one genus in this family (Clavavirus). Within this genus, a single species has been described to date: Aeropyrum pernix bacilliform virus 1 (APBV1, Clavavirus yamagawaense).

The name is derived from the Latin word clava, meaning cudgel, and referring to the thick, stick-like nature of the virus.

== Virology ==
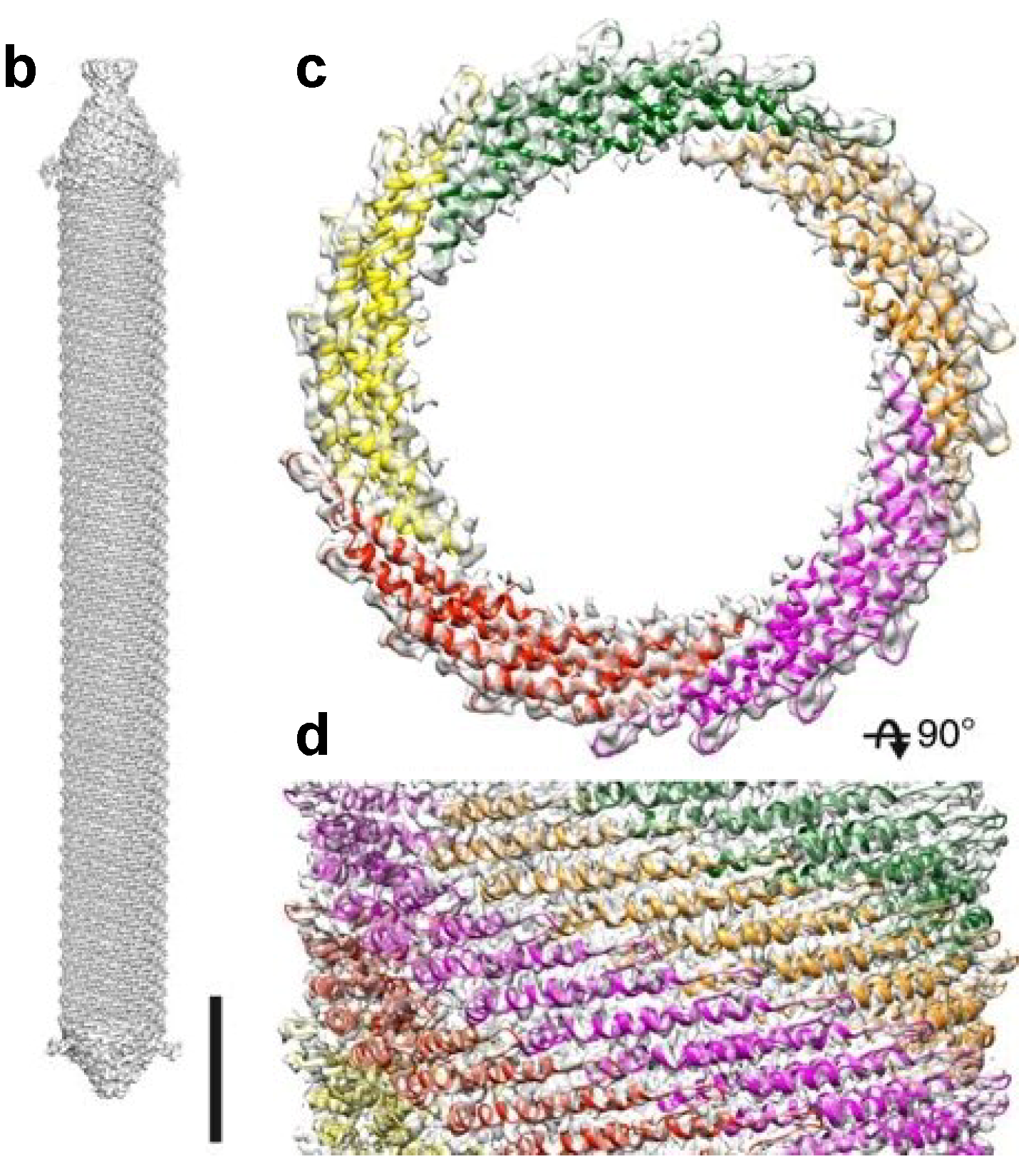
3D reconstruction of the virion structure of Aeropyrum pernix bacilliform virus 1 (APBV1). Scale bar 10 nm.

The virions are bacilliform in shape and 143 nanometers (nm) in length and 15.8 nm in diameter. One end is pointed and the other is rounded. The structure of the APBV1 virion has been solved by cryo-electron microscopy to near-atomic resolution, revealing how the helical particle is built from an alpha-helical major capsid protein with a unique structural fold. Virions are highly thermostable and remain infectious after incubation at 100 °C for 3 hours.

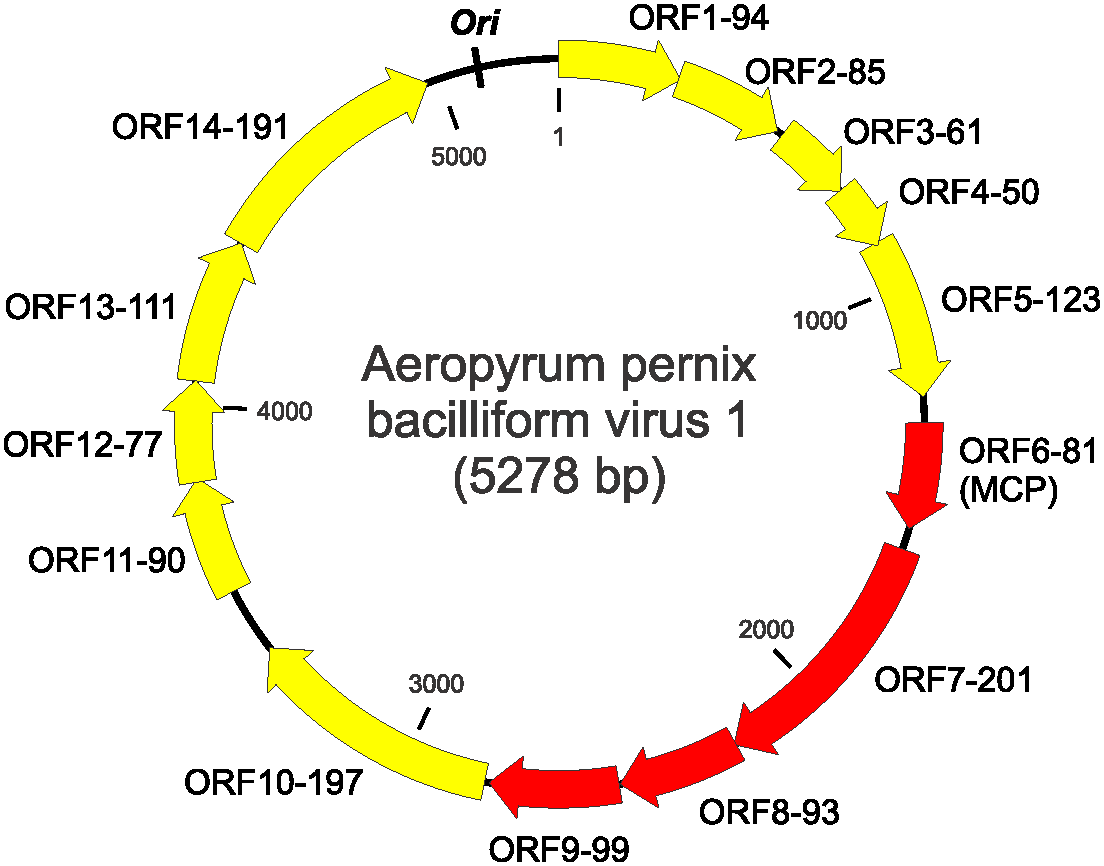
APBV1 genome map

The genome is a circular double-stranded DNA molecule of 5.3 kb. It does not integrate into the host genome. The genome contains 14 open reading frames, none of which share similarity with sequences in public databases.

Infection with this virus does not cause host cell lysis.
