= Spiraviridae =

Virus classification
- (unranked): Virus
- Family: Spiraviridae
- Genus: Alphaspiravirus

Species
- Alphaspiravirus yamagawaense

Synonyms
- ACV Virus name abbr.; HE681887 GenBank accession; NC_043427 REFSEQ accession

Family of viruses

Spiraviridae is a family of incertae sedis viruses that replicate in hyperthermophilic archaea of the genus Aeropyrum, specifically Aeropyrum pernix. The family contains one genus, Alphaspiravirus, which contains one species, Aeropyrum coil-shaped virus (ACV, Alphaspiravirus yamagawaense). The virions of ACV are non-enveloped and in the shape of hollow cylinders that are formed by a coiling fiber that consists of two intertwining halves of the circular DNA strand inside a capsid. An appendage protrudes from each end of the cylindrical virion. The viral genome is ssDNA(+) and encodes for significantly more genes than other known ssDNA viruses. ACV is also unique in that it appears to lack its own enzymes to aid replication, instead likely using the host cell's replisomes. ACV has no known relation to any other archaea-infecting viruses, but it does share its coil-like morphology with some other archaeal viruses, suggesting that such viruses may be an ancient lineage that only infect archaea.

== Name ==
The names Alphaspiravirus and Spiraviridae are both from latin spira for "coil".

== Structure ==
Virions of ACV are non-enveloped and in the shape of hollow cylinders approximately 230±10 by 19±1 nanometers (nm) in size. The cylindrical shape is formed by the coiling of a nucleoprotein filament as a helical spring. This coil-like structure is itself formed by two intertwining halves of a circular, ssDNA molecule in another helical shape that is covered by capsid proteins. Each end of the cylindrical virion has an appendage about 20±2 nm in length protruding from the virion at a 45° angle relative to the axis of the virion. For about 80% of virions, the appendages protrude from the same face of the virion. The virion is flexible, capable of contracting and stiffening upon being dehydrated. Virions have two major proteins with molecular masses of about 23 and 18.5 kilodaltons (kDa) and a few minor proteins with molecular masses of 5–13 kDa. Approximately 40 discs or turns of the helix are distinguishable for the length of the virion. The coil-like morphology of ACV is characteristic of certain archaeal viruses, not being found among bacterial and eukaryotic viruses.

== Genome ==
ACV contains a single molecule of circular, positive-sense, single-stranded DNA ((+)ssDNA) that is 24,893 nucleotides in length. The GC-content of the genome is 46.7%. The genome is predicted to have 57 open reading frames (ORFs) larger than 40 codons, such ORFs comprising 93.5% of the genome. All but one ORF has the same directionality as the DNA strand, indicating that the genome is positive-sense. The number of predicted genes is much greater than other known ssDNA viruses. These include genes that encode for a putative trypsin-like serine protease, a tyrosine recombinase, two thioredoxin-like proteins, proteins involved in carbohydrate metabolism, and DNA-binding proteins.

== Replication ==
ACV does not encode any identifiable DNA or RNA polymerases, nor does it encode any proteins homologous to known Rep proteins used by most known ssDNA viruses in replication. As such, ACV is likely to replicate in a manner that depends on the host replisome. After replication, virions leave the host cell without the host cell undergoing lysis, or cell death.

== Evolution ==
ACV has no known relation to any other viruses. However, some other archaeal viruses also have coil-shaped virions like ACV, which may indicate such morphology is an ancient form that is not represented among viruses that infect eukaryotes and other prokaryotes.

== History ==
ACV was first isolated from a sample of Aeropyrum pernix (A. pernix) taken from the coastal Yamagawa Hot Spring, where the temperature can reach 109 °C, in Japan in 2010. As A. pernix was the only organism present in the culture, it was recognized as the host of ACV. ACV could not be replicated in other strains of A. pernix or in Aeropyrum camini, so the original A. pernix culture was used for study. The family, genus, and species were recognized by the ICTV in 2013.
