= Ovaliviridae =

Alphaovalivirus

Virus classification
- (unranked): Virus
- Family: Ovaliviridae
- Genus: Alphaovalivirus

Species
- Alphaovalivirus fumarolicaense

Family of viruses

Ovaliviridae is a family of viruses of archaea that is not assigned to any higher taxonomic ranks. The family contains a single genus, Alphaovalivirus, which contains a single species, Sulfolobus ellipsoid virus 1 (Alphaovalivirus fumarolicaense). The linear genome of dsDNA is 23,219 bp with 172 bp inverted terminal repeats. Sulfolobus ellipsoid virus 1 was isolated from an acidic hot spring (86−106oC, pH 2.2−2.5) in Laguna Fumarólica, Costa Rica; the only known host is Sulfolobus sp. A20.
