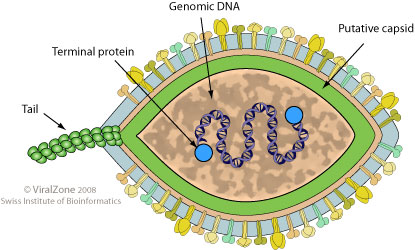
- Diagram of virion structure
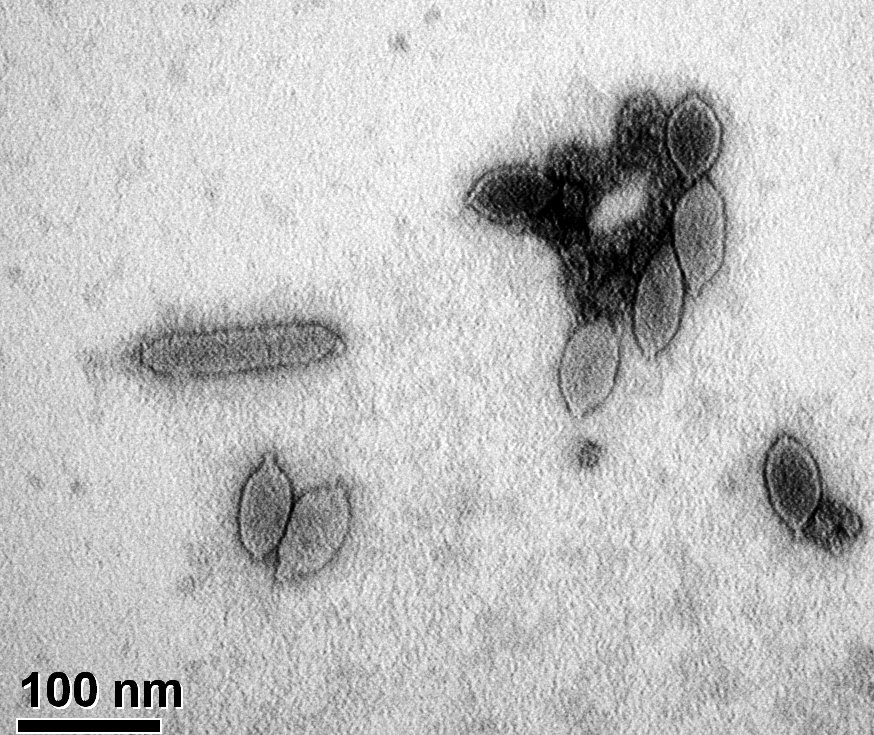
- Transmission electron micrograph of virions, negatively stained with uranyl acetate. Scale bar = 100 nm.

Virus classification
- (unranked): Virus
- Family: Halspiviridae
- Genus: Salterprovirus

Species
- Salterprovirus His1
- Locality of isolation: saltern crystalliser in Avalon, Victoria, Australia

Synonyms
- Salterprovirus: Epsilonfusellovirus; Salterprovirus His1: His 1 virus ICTV 2004

= Halspiviridae =

Salterprovirus

Family of viruses

Halspiviridae is a family of viruses that consists of a single genus, Salterprovirus, which consists of a single recognised species; Halovirus His1 (His1, Salterprovirus australiense). This virus was isolated from hypersaline water in Australia and was able to be cultured on the halophilic archaeon Haloarcula hispanica. Like many other archaeoviruses, His1 has an approximately limoniform (lemon-shaped) virion.

== Etymology ==
The family name, Halspiviridae, is derived from halophilic and spindle-shaped, in reference to the habitat and virion morphology, respectively. The genus name, Salterprovirus, is derived from salty terminal protein virus, as the linear dsDNA genome has proteins attached to the 5′ termini.

== Taxonomy ==
The virion has a spindle-shaped morphology and is similar in shape to that of viruses infecting thermophilic archaea, the Fuselloviridae, and His1 was originally described as a probable member of that group. However, it was later found that there is no genetic relationship and their replication strategies are entirely different, and so His1 was classified into a new group, genus Salterprovirus within the family Halspiviridae. Halspiviridae has not been classified within any higher-ranked taxa.

Environmental DNA sequences derived from Namib salt pans indicate the presence of currently unrecognised, distant relatives of His1.

Another species of virus, now named Gammapleolipovirus His2 (hereafter 'His2'), was originally considered to be related to His1, but later analysis of the His2 virion revealed that this species actually belongs to the family Pleolipoviridae.

== Structure ==
The virus is enveloped, with limoniform or spindle-shaped morphology. Genomes are linear, around 14.5kb in length. The genome has 35 open reading frames. A negatively stained electron microscope (EM) picture of His1 virions is shown on the right of this page. There is some variation in particle length (e.g. example seen left of centre), but most display the typical limoniform capsid with a short tail. High resolution micrographs and cryoEM reconstructions have been published by Hong et al. (2015), who gave average dimensions of 92 × 40 nm with a 12 nm tail.

Structure	Capsid	Genomic arrangement	Genomic segmentation
Limoniform	Protein	Linear	Monopartite

== Replication cycle ==
Viral replication is cytoplasmic. Entry into the host cell is achieved by virus attachment to the host cell. An adsorption rate constant for His1 of 1.9 × 10^{−12} ml min^{−1} has been experimentally determined by Pietilä et al. (2013). DNA-templated transcription is the method of transcription. Haloarcula hispanica may serve as a host. Transmission occurs via passive diffusion.

Host details	Tissue tropism	Entry details	Release details	Replication site	Assembly site	Transmission
Archea: Haloarcula hispanica	None	Injection	Lytic	Cytoplasm	Cytoplasm	Passive diffusion

== Genome ==
Genomic information
- Genome size: 14,464 nucleotides
- Year of completion: 2020

The linear, dsDNA genome of His1 consists of 14,464 base-pairs (bp), has imperfect inverted terminal repeat sequences of 105 bp, and is annotated to carry 35 protein coding genes, including a gene specifying a protein-primed DNA polymerase (B-family). The ends of the genome have a protein attached.
