= Guttaviridae =

Virus classification
- (unranked): Virus
- Family: Guttaviridae

Genera
- Alphaguttavirus (removed) ICTV 2021; Betaguttavirus

Family of viruses

Guttaviridae is a family of viruses. Archaea serve as natural hosts. The name is derived from the Latin gutta, meaning 'droplet'. The family contains one genus, Alphaguttavirus, which contains one species: Aeropyrum pernix ovoid virus 1 (Betaguttavirus kodakarajimaense).

== Taxonomy ==
The family currently contains one genera and species:

- Betaguttavirus
  - Aeropyrum pernix ovoid virus 1 (Betaguttavirus kodakarajimaense)

Genus Alphaguttavirus and species Sulfolobus newzealandicus droplet-shaped virus were removed in ICTV version 2021.

== Structure ==
Viruses in the family Guttaviridae are enveloped. The diameter is around 55–80 nm, with a length of 75–130 nm. Genomes are circular double-stranded DNA around 14 kilobases in length. Virions are ovoid or droplet-shaped and covered with globular subunits.

== Life cycle ==
DNA-templated transcription is the method of transcription. Archaea serve as the natural host.
