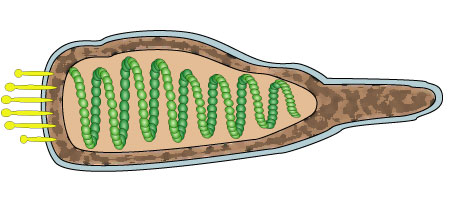
- Ampullavirus

Virus classification
- (unranked): Virus
- Family: Ampullaviridae
- Genus: Bottigliavirus

= Ampullaviridae =

Family of viruses

Bottigliavirus is the only genus in the family Ampullaviridae and contains 3 species. Ampullaviridae infect archaea of the genus Acidianus. The name of the family and genus is derived from the Latin word for bottle, ampulla, due to the virions having the shape of a bottle. The family was first described during an investigation of the microbial flora of hot springs in Italy.

== Taxonomy ==
The genus Bottigliavirus contains the following species, listed by scientific name and followed by the exemplar virus of the species:

- Bottigliavirus krisuvikense, Acidianus bottle-shaped virus 3 (ABV3)
- Bottigliavirus pozzuoliense, Acidianus bottle-shaped virus (ABV)
- Bottigliavirus puteoliense, Acidianus bottle-shaped virus 2 (ABV2)

== Structure and genome ==
Ampullaviruses have unique morphology, with the virions being bottle-shaped with one narrow end that smoothly expands into a wider end for an overall length of about 230 nm and width of about 75 nm at the broad end. The narrow end projects beyond the viral envelope and is likely used to inject the viral DNA into host cells. The broad end possesses about 20 thin filaments, each that are regularly distributed in a ring. Inside the envelope is a funnel-shaped protein coat that houses the viral DNA.The genome of ampullaviruses is linear, double-stranded DNA that is about 23.8 kilobases in length. The genome contains an estimated 56 or 57 open reading frames that encode for at least six structural proteins.

== Life cycle ==
Viral replication is cytoplasmic. Entry into the host cell is achieved by virus attaching to the host cell. DNA-templated transcription is the method of transcription. Archaea of the genus Acidianus serve as the natural host. Transmission routes are passive diffusion.
