= List of virus families and subfamilies =

Virus classification showing major ranks

This is a list of biological virus families and subfamilies. See also Comparison of computer viruses

This is an alphabetical list of biological virus families and subfamilies; it includes those families and subfamilies listed by the ICTV 2025 report.

- For a list of virus genera, see List of virus genera.
- For a list of virus realms, subrealms, kingdoms, subkingdoms, phyla, subphyla, classes, subclasses, orders, and suborders, see List of higher virus taxa.

== Families ==
=== A ===
- Abyssoviridae
- Ackermannviridae
- Adamaviridae
- Adenoviridae
- Aggregaviridae
- Ahmunviridae
- Ahpuchviridae
- Aliceevansviridae
- Alisviridae
- Aliusviridae
- Alloherpesviridae
- Allomimiviridae
- Alphaflexiviridae
- Alphagokushoviridae
- Alphaormycoviridae
- Alphatetraviridae
- Alternaviridae
- Altumviridae
- Alvernaviridae
- Amalgaviridae
- Ambiguiviridae
- Amesuviridae
- Amnoonviridae
- Ampullaviridae
- Anaerodiviridae
- Anamaviridae
- Andersonviridae
- Anelloviridae
- Anicreviridae
- Aoguangviridae
- Apasviridae
- Arenaviridae
- Arenbergviridae
- Armatusviridae
- Arteriviridae
- Artiviridae
- Artoviridae
- Ascoviridae
- Asemoviridae
- Asfarviridae
- Aspiviridae
- Assalcaviridae
- Assiduviridae
- Astroviridae
- Atkinsviridae
- Autolykiviridae
- Autonotataviridae
- Autoscriptoviridae
- Autosignataviridae
- Autotranscriptaviridae

=== B ===
- Bacilladnaviridae
- Baculoviridae
- Barnaviridae
- Basaltiviridae
- Belpaoviridae
- Benyviridae
- Berryhillviridae
- Betaflexiviridae
- Betagokushoviridae
- Betaormycoviridae
- Bicaudaviridae
- Bidnaviridae
- Birnaviridae
- Blefusviridae
- Blumeviridae
- Bornaviridae
- Botourmiaviridae
- Botybirnaviridae
- Bromoviridae
- Buchnerviridae
- Burtonviroviridae

=== C ===
- Caliciviridae
- Carmotetraviridae
- Casidaviridae
- Casjensviridae
- Caulimoviridae
- Chaacviridae
- Chaseviridae
- Chicoviridae
- Chimalliviridae
- Chiyouviridae
- Chrysoviridae
- Chuviridae
- Circoviridae
- Clavaviridae
- Clermontviridae
- Closteroviridae
- Colingsworthviridae
- Connertonviridae
- Coronaviridae
- Corticoviridae
- Cremegaviridae
- Crepuscuviridae
- Crevaviridae
- Cruliviridae
- Curvulaviridae
- Cystoviridae

=== D ===
- Dallocaviridae
- Danacaviridae
- Darmviridae
- Deltaflexiviridae
- Deltanormycoviridae
- Demerecviridae
- Dicistroviridae
- Discoviridae
- Dishuiviroviridae
- Draupnirviridae
- Drexlerviridae
- Druskaviridae
- Duinviridae
- Dumbiviridae
- Duneviridae

=== E ===
- Ehrlichviridae
- Ekchuahviridae
- Endolinaviridae
- Endornaviridae
- Epsomviridae
- Eubullaviridae
- Eupolintoviridae
- Eurekaviridae
- Euroniviridae

=== F ===
- Felixviridae
- Fervensviridae
- Fiersviridae
- Filamentoviridae
- Filoviridae
- Fimoviridae
- Finnlakeviridae
- Flaviviridae
- Forsetiviridae
- Fredfastierviridae
- Fusagraviridae
- Fusariviridae
- Fuselloviridae
- Fuxiviridae

=== G ===
- Gammaflexiviridae
- Gammaormycoviridae
- Gandrviridae
- Geminiviridae
- Genomoviridae
- Geplanaviridae
- Giardiaviridae
- Globuloviridae
- Graaviviridae
- Gresnaviridae
- Grimontviridae
- Groupodiviridae
- Guelinviridae
- Gulliviridae
- Gulliviroviridae
- Guttaviridae

=== H ===
- Hadakaviridae
- Hafunaviridae
- Hakuzoviridae
- Halicoviridae
- Haloferuviridae
- Halomagnusviridae
- Halspiviridae
- Hantaviridae
- Helgolandviridae
- Hepaciviridae
- Hepadnaviridae
- Hepeviridae
- Herelleviridae
- Hirszfeldviridae
- Hodgkinviridae
- Huangdiviridae
- Hydriviridae
- Hypoviridae
- Hytrosaviridae

=== I ===
- Iflaviridae
- Infernusviridae
- Inoviridae
- Inseviridae
- Intestiviridae
- Iridoviridae
- Itzamnaviridae

=== J ===
- Jasonviridae
- Jeanschmidtviridae

=== K ===
- Kairosviridae
- Kanorauviridae
- Kidogoviridae
- Kirkoviridae
- Kitaviridae
- Kleczkowskaviridae
- Kolmioviridae
- Konkoviridae
- Konodaiviridae
- Krittikaviridae
- Kruegerviridae
- Kunpengviridae
- Kyanoviridae

=== L ===
- Lakviridae
- Lebotiviridae
- Leishbuviridae
- Leisingerviridae
- Liberviridae
- Lilleviridae
- Lilliviridae
- Lindbergviridae
- Lipothrixviridae
- Lispiviridae
- Litenviridae
- Litilviridae
- Lomiviridae
- Ludisviridae
- Luriaviridae
- Lutetiaviridae
- Lutzviridae

=== M ===
- Madisaviridae
- Madridviridae
- Mahapunaviridae
- Malacoherpesviridae
- Mamonoviridae
- Mariniviridae
- Marnaviridae
- Marseilleviridae
- Matonaviridae
- Matsushitaviridae
- Maviroviridae
- Mayoviridae
- Mazaviridae
- Mazoviaviridae
- Medioniviridae
- Megabirnaviridae
- Megatotiviridae
- Mesomimiviridae
- Mesoniviridae
- Mestraviridae
- Mesyanzhinovviridae
- Metaviridae
- Metaxyviridae
- Mimiviridae
- Mitoviridae
- Molycolviridae
- Monocitiviridae
- Mononiviridae
- Mtkvariviridae
- Mycoalphaviridae
- Mymonaviridae
- Mypoviridae
- Myriaviridae

=== N ===
- Nairoviridae
- Nanghoshaviridae
- Nanhypoviridae
- Nanicoviridae
- Nanopleoviridae
- Nanoviridae
- Naomviridae
- Narnaviridae
- Naryaviridae
- Natareviridae
- Nenyaviridae
- Nimaviridae
- Nipumfusiviridae
- Nixviridae
- Nodaviridae
- Noraviridae
- Nudiviridae
- Nyamiviridae

=== O ===
- Obscuriviridae
- Occultatumviridae
- Olifoviridae
- Omnilimnoviroviridae
- Oomyviridae
- Ootiviridae
- Orlajensenviridae
- Orpheoviridae
- Orthoherpesviridae
- Orthomyxoviridae
- Orthototiviridae
- Osikeviridae
- Ourmiaviridae
- Ouroboviridae
- Ovaliviridae

=== P ===
- Pachyviridae
- Pamosaviridae
- Papillomaviridae
- Parahypoviridae
- Paramyxoviridae
- Parnassusviridae
- Partitiviridae
- Parvoviridae
- Paulinoviridae
- Pecoviridae
- Peduoviridae
- Pequenoviridae
- Peribunyaviridae
- Permutotetraviridae
- Pervagoviridae
- Pestiviridae
- Phasmaviridae
- Phenuiviridae
- Phlegiviridae
- Phycodnaviridae
- Phypoliviridae
- Piccoloviridae
- Pichoviridae
- Picobirnaviridae
- Picornaviridae
- Pieniviridae
- Pigerviridae
- Pikkuviridae
- Pistolviridae
- Pithoviridae
- Piticuviridae
- Pituviridae
- Plasmaviridae
- Plectroviridae
- Pleolipoviridae
- Pneumoviridae
- Polycipiviridae
- Polymycoviridae
- Polyomaviridae
- Pootjesviridae
- Portogloboviridae
- Potyliviridae
- Potyviridae
- Poxviridae
- Pseudototiviridae
- Pseudoviridae
- Pungoviridae
- Pyrstoviridae

=== Q ===
- Qinviridae
- Quadriviridae
- Quambiviridae
- Quasboviridae

=== R ===
- Redondoviridae
- Retroviridae
- Rhabdoviridae
- Rhizouliviridae
- Roniviridae
- Rountreeviridae
- Rudiviridae
- Ruviroviridae

=== S ===
- Saffermanviridae
- Saladoviridae
- Salasmaviridae
- Saparoviridae
- Sarkviridae
- Sarthroviridae
- Satyavativiridae
- Schitoviridae
- Schizomimiviridae
- Seadebiviridae
- Secoviridae
- Sedoreoviridae
- Shortaselviridae
- Simuloviridae
- Sinhaliviridae
- Skuldviridae
- Smacoviridae
- Soleiviridae
- Solemoviridae
- Solinviviridae
- Solspiviridae
- Soropartitiviridae
- Speroviridae
- Sphaerolipoviridae
- Spiciviridae
- Spinareoviridae
- Spiraviridae
- Splipalmiviridae
- Sputniviroviridae
- Stackebrandtviridae
- Stanwilliamsviridae
- Steigviridae
- Steitzviridae
- Straboviridae
- Sukshmaviridae
- Sunviridae
- Suolaviridae
- Suoliviridae

=== T ===
- Tainaviridae
- Tectiviridae
- Tenebraviridae
- Thalassapleoviridae
- Thaspiviridae
- Tinaiviridae
- Tobaliviridae
- Tobaniviridae
- Togaviridae
- Tombusviridae
- Tomosaviridae
- Tonesaviridae
- Tosoviridae
- Tospoviridae
- Toyamaviridae
- Trautnerviridae
- Trimbiviridae
- Tripviridae
- Tristromaviridae
- Tulasviridae
- Turriviridae
- Tymoviridae

=== U ===
- Umezonoviridae
- Unambiviridae
- Ungulaviridae
- Usuviridae

=== V ===
- Vandenendeviridae
- Verdandiviridae
- Vertoviridae
- Vilmaviridae
- Vilyaviridae
- Virgaviridae

=== W ===
- Winoviridae
- Wupedeviridae

=== X ===
- Xigoviridae
- Xinmoviridae

=== Y ===
- Yadokariviridae
- Yadonushiviridae
- Yamazakiviridae
- Yangangviridae
- Yanlukaviridae
- Yaraviridae
- Yueviridae

=== Z ===
- Zierdtviridae
- Zimmerviridae
- Zobellviridae

== Subfamilies ==
=== A ===
- Actantavirinae
- Agantavirinae
- Aglimvirinae
- Aliimimivirinae
- Alphabravovirinae
- Alphaherpesvirinae
- Alphairidovirinae
- Alpharhabdovirinae
- Alvaradovirinae
- Andregratiavirinae
- Andrewesvirinae
- Arquatrovirinae
- Asinivirinae
- Avulavirinae
- Azeredovirinae

=== B ===
- Bastillevirinae
- Bclasvirinae
- Bearivirinae
- Beaumontvirinae
- Becregavirinae
- Beephvirinae
- Beijerinckvirinae
- Betaherpesvirinae
- Betairidovirinae
- Betarhabdovirinae
- Boorivirinae
- Boydwoodruffvirinae
- Bradleyvirinae
- Braunvirinae
- Brisouvirinae
- Brockvirinae
- Bronfenbrennervirinae

=== C ===
- Calvusvirinae
- Caphthovirinae
- Cardingvirinae
- Ceeclamvirinae
- Ceeteevirinae
- Ceronivirinae
- Chebruvirinae
- Chimanivirinae
- Chordopoxvirinae
- Churivirinae
- Cleopatravirinae
- Coarsevirinae
- Cobavirinae
- Colwellvirinae
- Comovirinae
- Corkvirinae
- Crocarterivirinae
- Crudevirinae
- Cvivirinae

=== D ===
- Daemsvirinae
- Dclasvirinae
- Deejayvirinae
- Deeyouvirinae
- Deltarhabdovirinae
- Demetervirinae
- Denniswatsonvirinae
- Densovirinae
- Doltivirinae
- Dovevirinae
- Dravavirinae
- Dunnvirinae
- Durvirinae

=== E ===
- Eekayvirinae
- Emilbogenvirinae
- Emmerichvirinae
- Enquatrovirinae
- Ensavirinae
- Entomopoxvirinae
- Equarterivirinae
- Ermolyevavirinae
- Erskinevirinae

=== F ===
- Feeclasvirinae
- Feraresvirinae
- Ferrettivirinae
- Firstpapillomavirinae
- Frickvirinae
- Frobishervirinae
- Fuhrmanvirinae

=== G ===
- Gaffkyvirinae
- Gammaherpesvirinae
- Gammarhabdovirinae
- Gclasvirinae
- Gebvirinae
- Glossavirinae
- Gochnauervirinae
- Gofosavirinae
- Gordonclarkvirinae
- Gorgonvirinae
- Gorskivirinae
- Gracegardnervirinae
- Guarnerosvirinae
- Guernseyvirinae
- Gujervirinae
- Gutmannvirinae

=== H ===
- Hamavirinae
- Heleneionescovirinae
- Hendrixvirinae
- Hepanvirinae
- Heptrevirinae
- Heroarterivirinae
- Hexponivirinae
- Humphriesvirinae
- Hyporhamsavirinae

=== I ===
- Ichthysvirinae
- Iiscvirinae

=== J ===
- Jacobvirinae
- Jameshumphriesvirinae
- Jasinskavirinae
- Jianjiangvirinae
- Joanripponvirinae
- Johnpaulvirinae
- Jondennisvirinae

=== K ===
- Kamposvirinae
- Kantovirinae
- Klosneuvirinae
- Kodimesavirinae
- Krylovirinae
- Kutznervirinae

=== L ===
- Langleyhallvirinae
- Lclasvirinae
- Letovirinae
- Loccivirinae
- Loutivirinae

=== M ===
- Maevirinae
- Mammantavirinae
- Markadamsvirinae
- Mascarenevirinae
- Mccleskeyvirinae
- Mccorquodalevirinae
- Mclasvirinae
- Mcshanvirinae
- Medionivirinae
- Megamimivirinae
- Melnykvirinae
- Menanivirinae
- Metallovirinae
- Metaparamyxovirinae
- Metotonivirinae
- Migulavirinae
- Molineuxvirinae
- Mononivirinae
- Munstervirinae

=== N ===
- Nclasvirinae
- Nefertitivirinae
- Northropvirinae
- Nymbaxtervirinae

=== O ===
- Oafivirinae
- Obtuvirinae
- Okabevirinae
- Okanivirinae
- Orthocedratvirinae
- Orthocoronavirinae
- Orthohepevirinae
- Orthoparamyxovirinae
- Orthopithovirinae
- Orthoretrovirinae
- Ounavirinae

=== P ===
- Paavivirinae
- Parahepevirinae
- Parvovirinae
- Pclasvirinae
- Pearlrivervirinae
- Pelczarvirinae
- Penbrevirinae
- Picovirinae
- Piscanivirinae
- Pitovirinae
- Polsinellivirinae
- Pontosvirinae
- Procedovirinae

=== Q ===
- Quadringentisvirinae
- Queuovirinae
- Quingentivirinae
- Quinvirinae

=== R ===
- Rabinowitzvirinae
- Rakietenvirinae
- Regressovirinae
- Remotovirinae
- Repantavirinae
- Reternivirinae
- Rhodovirinae
- Rodepovirinae
- Rogunavirinae
- Rothmandenesvirinae
- Rubulavirinae
- Ruthgordonvirinae

=== S ===
- Santaclaravirinae
- Sarlesvirinae
- Schenleyvirinae
- Sechaudvirinae
- Secondpapillomavirinae
- Sejongvirinae
- Sepvirinae
- Serpentovirinae
- Sescentorumvirinae
- Simarterivirinae
- Skoliovirinae
- Skryabinvirinae
- Skurskavirinae
- Slopekvirinae
- Spounavirinae
- Spumaretrovirinae
- Stanbaylleyvirinae
- Staniewskivirinae
- Stentvirinae
- Stephanstirmvirinae
- Studiervirinae

=== T ===
- Tatarstanvirinae
- Tempevirinae
- Tevenvirinae
- Tiamatvirinae
- Torovirinae
- Toshachvirinae
- Trabyvirinae
- Trivirinae
- Tunavirinae
- Twarogvirinae
- Twortvirinae
- Tybeckvirinae

=== U ===
- Uncouvirinae

=== V ===
- Variarterivirinae
- Vequintavirinae

=== W ===
- Waldeevirinae
- Wallmarkvirinae
- Weiservirinae
- Wollmanvirinae

=== Z ===
- Zealarterivirinae

== See also ==
- List of higher virus taxa
- List of virus genera
- Lists of virus taxa
- Table of clinically important viruses
- Virology
- Virus
- Virus classification
- Wikipedia:WikiProject Viruses
- WikiSpecies:Virus
