= List of higher virus taxa =

Virus classification showing major ranks

This is a list of biological virus upper-level taxa. See also Comparison of computer viruses

This is an alphabetical list of biological virus higher taxa. It includes those taxa above family, ranging from realm to suborder, that are included in the ICTV's 2025 taxonomy release.

For a list of virus genera, see List of genera of viruses.

For a list of family-level viral taxa, see List of virus families and subfamilies.

== Realms ==
- Adnaviria
- Duplodnaviria
- Efunaviria
- Floreoviria
- Pleomoviria
- Riboviria
- Ribozyviria
- Singelaviria
- Varidnaviria
- Volvereviria

== Kingdoms ==
- Abadenavirae
- Bamfordvirae
- Helvetiavirae
- Heunggongvirae
- Loebvirae
- Orthornavirae
- Pararnavirae
- Sangervirae
- Shotokuvirae
- Trapavirae
- Zilligvirae

== Phyla and subphyla ==
=== Phyla ===
- Ambiviricota
- Artimaviricota
- Artverviricota
- Calorviricota
- Commensaviricota
- Cossaviricota
- Cressdnaviricota
- Dividoviricota
- Duplornaviricota
- Hofneiviricota
- Kitrinoviricota
- Lenarviricota
- Negarnaviricota
- Nucleocytoviricota
- Peploviricota
- Phixviricota
- Pisuviricota
- Preplasmiviricota
- Produgelaviricota
- Saleviricota
- Taleaviricota
- Uroviricota

=== Subphyla ===
- Haploviricotina
- Polisuviricotina
- Polyploviricotina
- Prepoliviricotina

== Classes ==
- Ainoaviricetes
- Alsuviricetes
- Amabiliviricetes
- Aquintoviricetes
- Arfiviricetes
- Belvinaviricetes
- Bunyaviricetes
- Caminiviricetes
- Cardeaviricetes
- Caudoviricetes
- Chrymotiviricetes
- Chunqiuviricetes
- Duplopiviricetes
- Faserviricetes
- Flasuviricetes
- Furtirnaviricetes
- Herviviricetes
- Howeltoviricetes
- Huolimaviricetes
- Insthoviricetes
- Laserviricetes
- Leviviricetes
- Magsaviricetes
- Megaviricetes
- Miaviricetes
- Microviricetes
- Milneviricetes
- Monjiviricetes
- Mouviricetes
- Mriyaviricetes
- Mycopleornaviricetes
- Naldaviricetes
- Orpoviricetes
- Papovaviricetes
- Pharingeaviricetes
- Pisoniviricetes
- Pokkesviricetes
- Polintoviricetes
- Quintoviricetes
- Repensiviricetes
- Resentoviricetes
- Revtraviricetes
- Stelpaviricetes
- Suforviricetes
- Tectiliviricetes
- Tokiviricetes
- Tolucaviricetes
- Vidaverviricetes
- Virophaviricetes
- Yunchangviricetes

== Orders and suborders ==
=== Orders ===
- Adrikavirales
- Ageovirales
- Algavirales
- Alpavirales
- Amarillovirales
- Amoyvirales
- Amphintovirales
- Archintovirales
- Articulavirales
- Asfuvirales
- Atroposvirales
- Autographivirales
- Baphyvirales
- Belfryvirales
- Blubervirales
- Bormycovirales
- Bullavirales
- Chitovirales
- Cirlivirales
- Coyopavirales
- Crassvirales
- Cremevirales
- Cryppavirales
- Crytulvirales
- Divaquavirales
- Divpevirales
- Ducavirales
- Durnavirales
- Elliovirales
- Formycovirales
- Geplafuvirales
- Ghabrivirales
- Gokushovirales
- Goujianvirales
- Grandevirales
- Gredzevirales
- Halopanivirales
- Haloruvirales
- Hareavirales
- Hepelivirales
- Herpesvirales
- Hypofuvirales
- Imitervirales
- Jingchuvirales
- Jormunvirales
- Juravirales
- Kalamavirales
- Kirjokansivirales
- Lautamovirales
- Lavidavirales
- Lefavirales
- Ligamenvirales
- Lineavirales
- Magrovirales
- Martellivirales
- Maximonvirales
- Metacrassvirales
- Methanobavirales
- Mindivirales
- Mividavirales
- Mononegavirales
- Mulpavirales
- Muvirales
- Naedrevirales
- Nakonvirales
- Nidovirales
- Nodamuvirales
- Norzivirales
- Ortervirales
- Ourlivirales
- Pantevenvirales
- Paracrassvirales
- Patatavirales
- Piccovirales
- Picornavirales
- Pimascovirales
- Polivirales
- Priklausovirales
- Primavirales
- Recrevirales
- Reekeekeevirales
- Reovirales
- Ringavirales
- Rivendellvirales
- Rohanvirales
- Roodoodoovirales
- Rowavirales
- Salinicovirales
- Sanitavirales
- Saturnivirales
- Secretvirales
- Sepolyvirales
- Sobelivirales
- Stellavirales
- Thumleimavirales
- Timlovirales
- Tolivirales
- Tombendovirales
- Tubulavirales
- Tymovirales
- Vinavirales
- Wolframvirales
- Xenadelphovirales
- Yadokarivirales
- Zurhausenvirales

=== Suborders ===
- Abnidovirineae
- Alphatotivirineae
- Arnidovirineae
- Betatotivirineae
- Cornidovirineae
- Gammatotivirineae
- Mesnidovirineae
- Monidovirineae
- Nanidovirineae
- Ocovirineae
- Orthomivirineae
- Paramivirineae
- Ronidovirineae
- Tornidovirineae

== See also ==
- Virus
- Virology
- Virus classification
- WikiSpecies:Virus
- Wikipedia:WikiProject Viruses
- List of virus genera
- Lists of virus taxa
