= Baltimore classification =

Virus classification system made by David Baltimore

Each Baltimore group's route of mRNA synthesis

Baltimore classification is a system used to classify viruses by their routes of transferring genetic information from the genome to messenger RNA (mRNA). Seven Baltimore groups, or classes, exist and are designated by the Roman numerals I to VII. Groups are defined by whether the viral genome is composed of deoxyribonucleic acid (DNA) or ribonucleic acid (RNA); whether the genome is single- or double-stranded; and whether the virus makes DNA from RNA (reverse transcription (RT)). Viruses with single-stranded genomes are further differentiated by whether these genomes are positive-sense (+) or negative-sense (–). Viruses within each of the Baltimore groups typically share a common replication method. Additional characteristics, such as virion structure, are not directly related to Baltimore classification and may not be shared by viruses within each group.

The seven Baltimore groups are for double-stranded DNA (dsDNA) viruses, single-stranded DNA (ssDNA) viruses, double-stranded RNA (dsRNA) viruses, positive-sense single-stranded RNA (+ssRNA) viruses, negative-sense single-stranded RNA (–ssRNA) viruses, ssRNA viruses that have a DNA intermediate in their life cycle (ssRNA-RT), and dsDNA viruses that have an RNA intermediate in their life cycle (dsDNA-RT). Only one class exists for ssDNA viruses because their genomes are converted to dsDNA before transcription regardless of sense. Some viruses belong to more than one Baltimore group, such as DNA viruses that have either dsDNA or ssDNA as their genome.

Many virus characteristics do not define which Baltimore group they belong to but do correlate to specific Baltimore groups. This includes the use of RNA editing and alternative splicing, whether the virus's genome is segmented, the size and structure of the virus's genome, the host range of viruses, whether the virus packages replication and transcription machinery into virions, and unorthodox methods of translating mRNA into proteins. Furthermore, while Baltimore groups were not established based on evolutionary relationships, research in the 21st century has found that certain groups, such as dsRNA, +ssRNA, and many –ssRNA viruses, share common ancestry.

Baltimore classification was created in 1971 by virologist David Baltimore and initially only included the first six groups. It was later expanded to include group VII after the discovery of dsDNA-RT viruses. Since then, it has become common among virologists to use Baltimore classification alongside virus taxonomy due to its utility. In 2018 and 2019, Baltimore classification was partially integrated into virus taxonomy based on evidence that certain groups were descended from common ancestors. Various taxa now correspond to specific Baltimore groups. An extension of Baltimore classification has been proposed by virologist Vadim Agol to encompass all possible routes of genetic information transmission.

== Overview ==
Baltimore classification groups viruses together by their routes of transferring genetic information from the genome to messenger RNA (mRNA). Characteristics that determine the Baltimore group of a virus include whether the genome is made of deoxyribonucleic acid (DNA) or ribonucleic acid (RNA), the strandedness of the genome, which can be either single- or double-stranded, the sense of a single-stranded RNA genome, which can be either positive (+) or negative (–), and whether the virus synthesizes DNA from RNA (reverse transcription (RT)). There are seven Baltimore groups or classes, numbered with Roman numerals, listed hereafter. (Note: The sense of an RNA strand refers to whether it can function as mRNA or if it is used as a template to synthesize mRNA. A (positive-)sense strand can act as mRNA, whereas the negative-sense strand, also called the antisense strand, serves as the template to synthesize mRNA. For DNA, the positive-sense (coding, non-template) strand has the same sequence as mRNA, but with uracil in RNA replaced with thymine in DNA, and the negative-sense (antisense, template) strand is used by RNA polymerase to synthesize mRNA. The words plus and minus are also used to refer to positive- and negative-sense strands, respectively.)

- Group I: double-stranded DNA viruses (dsDNA)
- Group II: single-stranded DNA viruses (ssDNA)
- Group III: double-stranded RNA viruses (dsRNA)
- Group IV: positive-sense single-stranded RNA viruses (+ssRNA)
- Group V: negative-sense single-stranded RNA viruses (–ssRNA) (Note: Other abbreviations for +ssRNA and –ssRNA viruses include (+)RNA, (–)RNA, ssRNA(+), and ssRNA(–).)
- Group VI: single-stranded RNA viruses with a DNA intermediate in their life cycle (ssRNA-RT)
- Group VII: double-stranded DNA viruses with an RNA intermediate in their life cycle (dsDNA-RT)

Baltimore classification is chiefly based on the path toward transcription of the viral genome, and viruses within each group usually share the manner by which the mRNA synthesis occurs. While not the direct focus of Baltimore classification, groups are organized in such a manner that viruses in each group also typically have the same mechanisms of replicating the viral genome. Structural characteristics of the extracellular virus particle, called a virion, such as the shape of the viral capsid, which stores the genome, and the presence of a viral envelope, a lipid membrane that surrounds the capsid, have no direct relation to Baltimore groups, nor do the groups necessarily show genetic relation based on evolutionary history.

== Baltimore groups ==
=== Group I: double-stranded DNA viruses ===
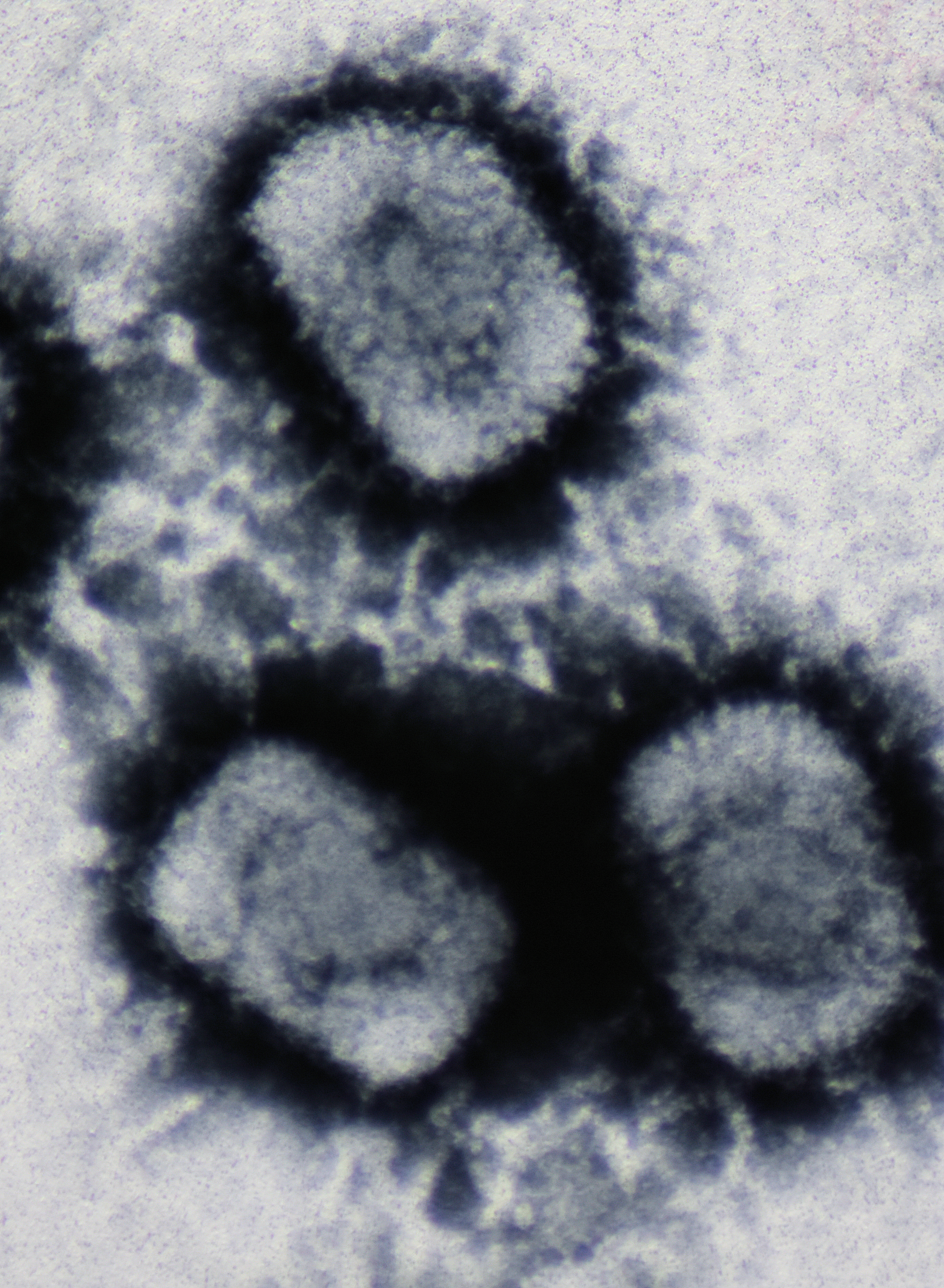
Poxviruses are dsDNA viruses.

The first Baltimore group contains viruses that have a double-stranded DNA (dsDNA) genome. All dsDNA viruses have their mRNA synthesized in a three-step process. First, a transcription preinitiation complex binds to the DNA upstream of the transcription site, recruiting a host RNA polymerase enzyme. Once the RNA polymerase is recruited, it uses the negative-sense strand as a template for synthesizing mRNA strands, which are positive sense. The RNA polymerase then terminates transcription upon reaching a specific signal, such as a polyadenylation site.

dsDNA viruses make use of several mechanisms to replicate their genome. A widely used method is bidirectional replication, in which two replication forks are established at a replication origin site and move in opposite directions on a DNA molecule. A rolling circle mechanism that produces linear strands while progressing in a loop around a circular genome is also common. Many dsDNA viruses use a strand displacement method whereby one strand is synthesized from a template strand, and a complementary strand is then synthesized from the previously synthesized strand to form a dsDNA genome. Lastly, some dsDNA viruses are replicated as part of a process called replicative transposition, whereby a viral genome that is integrated into a host cell's genome is replicated to another part of the host cell's genome.

dsDNA viruses can be divided informally into those that replicate in the nucleus, and as such are relatively dependent on host cell machinery for transcription and replication, and those that replicate in cytoplasm, in which case they have obtained their own means of transcription and replication. dsDNA viruses are also sometimes divided between tailed dsDNA viruses, which refers to members of the realm Duplodnaviria, specifically the head-tail of the class Caudoviricetes, and tailless or non-tailed (icosahedral) dsDNA viruses, which refers to viruses in the realms Singelaviria and Varidnaviria. (Note: Viruses in the realm Singelaviria were previously classified in the realm Varidnaviria before 2025, so sources that refer to Varidnaviria before 2025 are also referring to viruses that now belong to Singelaviria.)

dsDNA viruses are classified into six realms and many taxa that are unassigned to a realm:

- Viruses in the realms Adnaviria, Duplodnaviria, and Singelaviria are dsDNA viruses.
- In the realm Floreoviria, members of the class Papovaviricetes are dsDNA viruses.
- The realm Pleomoviria contains both dsDNA viruses and ssDNA viruses.
- Viruses in the realm Varidnaviria are dsDNA viruses except for the class Ainoaviricetes, which are ssDNA viruses.
- The following taxa that are unassigned to a realm exclusively contain dsDNA viruses:
  - Classes: Naldaviricetes
  - Families: Ampullaviridae, Basaltiviridae, Bicaudaviridae, Clavaviridae, Eurekaviridae, Fuselloviridae, Globuloviridae, Guttaviridae, Halspiviridae, Huangdiviridae, Itzamnaviridae, Lomiviridae, Nipumfusiviridae, Ovaliviridae, Plasmaviridae, Portogloboviridae, Thaspiviridae, Xigoviridae, Yamazakiviridae
  - Genera: Dinodnavirus

=== Group II: single-stranded DNA viruses ===
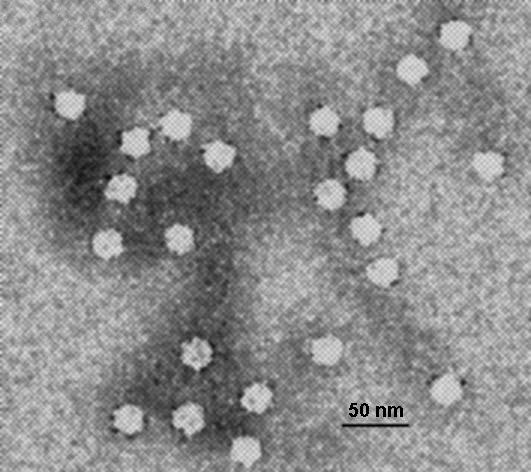
Parvoviruses are ssDNA viruses.

The second Baltimore group contains viruses that have a single-stranded DNA (ssDNA) genome. ssDNA viruses have the same manner of transcription as dsDNA viruses. Because the genome is single-stranded, however, it is first made into a double-stranded form by a DNA polymerase enzyme upon entering a host cell. mRNA is then synthesized from the double-stranded form. The double-stranded form of ssDNA viruses may be produced either directly after entry into a cell or as a consequence of replicating the viral genome.

Most ssDNA viruses contain circular genomes that are replicated by rolling circle replication (RCR). ssDNA RCR is initiated by an endonuclease enzyme that bonds to and cleaves the positive-sense strand, which allows a DNA polymerase to use the negative-sense strand as a template for replication. Replication progresses in a loop around the genome by extending the 3′-end ("three prime end") of the positive-sense strand, which displaces the prior positive-sense strand. (Note: The 5′-end and 3′-end of a DNA or RNA strand refer to whether there is a phosphate group attached to the end of the strand (the 5′-end) or if there is a free hydroxyl group at the end of the strand (the 3′-end). In double-stranded molecules, the 5′-end of one strand is opposite the 3′-end of the other strand as they are antiparallel and oriented in opposite directions.) The endonuclease then cleaves the positive-sense strand again to create a standalone genome that is joined (ligated) into a circular loop. The new ssDNA genome may be packaged into virions or replicated by a DNA polymerase to create a double-stranded form for transcription or additional rounds of replication.

Parvoviruses and bidnaviruses have linear ssDNA genomes that are replicated by rolling hairpin replication (RHR), which is similar to RCR. Their genomes have hairpin loops at each end of the genome that repeatedly unfold and refold during replication to change the direction of DNA synthesis to move back and forth along the linear genome, which produces numerous copies of the genome in a continuous process. Individual genomes are then excised from this molecule by the endonuclease.

Nearly all ssDNA viruses have positive-sense genomes, but a few exceptions and peculiarities exist. Anelloviruses are the only ssDNA viruses that have negative-sense genomes. Parvoviruses may package either the positive- or negative-sense strand into capsids. Lastly, bidnaviruses may package both the positive- and negative-sense strands of their bipartite genome. In any case, the sense of ssDNA viruses, unlike that of ssRNA viruses, is not sufficient to separate ssDNA viruses into two Baltimore groups since all ssDNA viral genomes are converted to dsDNA forms before transcription and replication.

ssDNA viruses are classified into five realms and a couple families that are unassigned to realms:

- Viruses in the realms Efunaviria and Volvereviria are ssDNA viruses.
- In the realm Floreoviria, members are ssDNA viruses except for viruses in the class Papovaviricetes, which are dsDNA viruses.
- The realm Pleomoviria contains both dsDNA viruses and ssDNA viruses.
- In the realm Varidnaviria, viruses of the class Ainoaviricetes are ssDNA viruses.
- The unassigned families Obscuriviridae and Spiraviridae are ssDNA virus families.

=== Group III: double-stranded RNA viruses ===
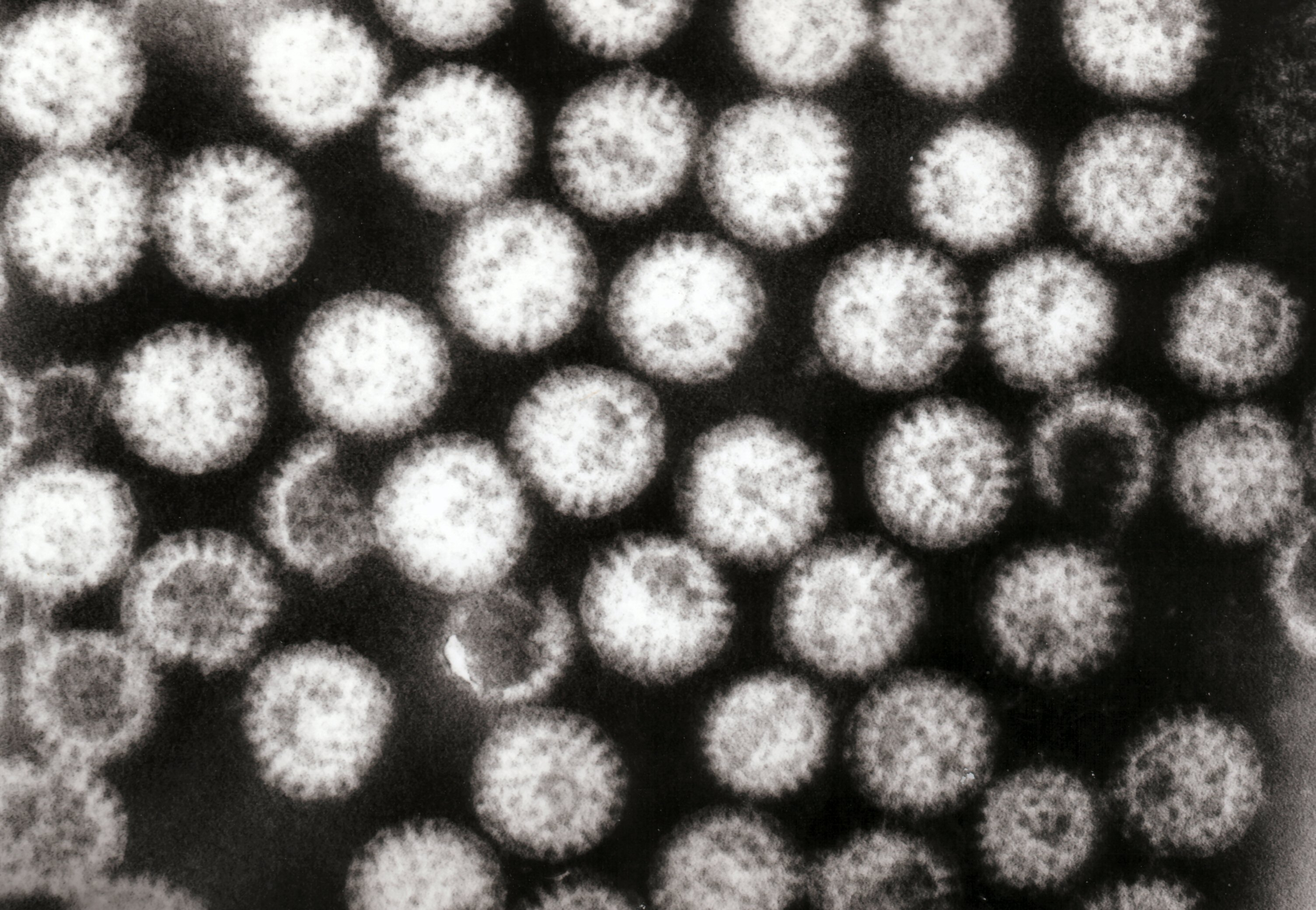
Rotaviruses are dsRNA viruses.

The third Baltimore group contains viruses that have a double-stranded RNA (dsRNA) genome. After entering a host cell, the viral RNA-dependent RNA polymerase (RdRp) synthesizes a positive-sense strand from the negative-sense strand of the dsRNA genome. This positive-sense strand may be used either as mRNA for translation or as a template for replication to form the dsRNA genome.

dsRNA is not a molecule made by cells, so eukaryotes have evolved antiviral systems to detect and inactivate viral dsRNA. To counter this, many dsRNA viruses replicate their genomes inside of capsids, thereby avoiding detection inside of the host cell's cytoplasm. Positive-sense strands are then forced out from the capsid to be translated or translocated from the mature capsid to a progeny capsid.

dsRNA viruses are classified into two phyla within the kingdom Orthornavirae, realm Riboviria:

- Viruses in the phylum Duplornaviricota are dsRNA viruses.
- In the phylum Pisuviricota, members of the class Duplopiviricetes are dsRNA viruses.

=== Group IV: positive-sense single-stranded RNA viruses ===
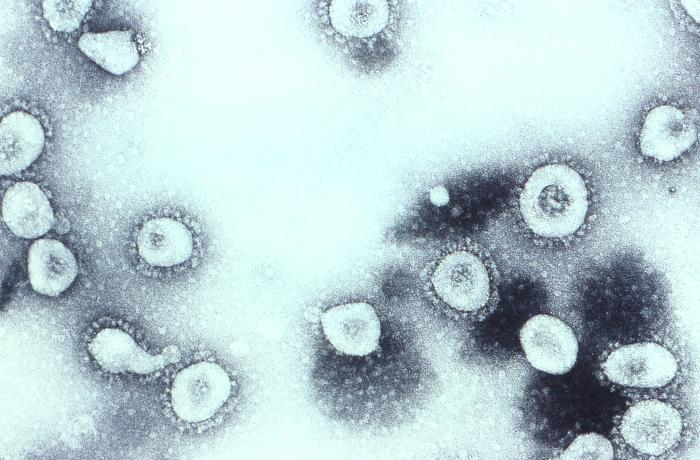
Coronaviruses are +ssRNA viruses.

The fourth Baltimore group contains viruses that have a positive-sense single-stranded RNA (+ssRNA) genome. For +ssRNA viruses, the genome functions as mRNA, so no transcription is required for translation. +ssRNA viruses will, however, produce positive-sense copies of the genome from negative-sense strands of an intermediate dsRNA genome. This acts as both a transcription and replication process since the replicated +ssRNA is also mRNA.

Many +ssRNA viruses are able to have only a portion of their genome transcribed. Typically, subgenomic RNA (sgRNA) strands are used for the translation of structural and movement proteins needed during intermediate and late stages of infection. sgRNA transcription may occur by commencing RNA synthesis within the genome rather than from the 5′-end ("five prime end"), by stopping RNA synthesis at specific sequences in the genome, or, as a part of both aforementioned methods, by synthesizing leader sequences from viral RNA that are then attached to sgRNA strands. During infection, the viral RdRp is always translated directly from the genome first because replication, performed by the RdRp, is required for sgRNA synthesis.

Because the process of replicating the viral genome produces intermediate dsRNA molecules, +ssRNA viruses can be targeted by the host cell's immune system. To avoid detection, +ssRNA viruses replicate in membrane-associated vesicles that are used as replication factories. From there, only +ssRNA strands enter the main cytoplasmic area of the cell. These strands may be used as mRNA or as progeny genomes.

+ssRNA viruses can be divided informally into those that have polycistronic mRNA, which encodes a polyprotein that is cleaved to form multiple mature proteins, and those that undergo multiple rounds of translation of the genome or subgenomic mRNAs to express proteins. +ssRNA viruses are classified into three phyla in the kingdom Orthornavirae, realm Riboviria:

- Viruses in the phyla Kitrinoviricota and Lenarviricota are +ssRNA viruses.
- Viruses in the phylum Pisuviricota are +ssRNA viruses, excluding the class Duplopiviricetes, which contains dsRNA viruses.

=== Group V: negative-sense single-stranded RNA viruses ===
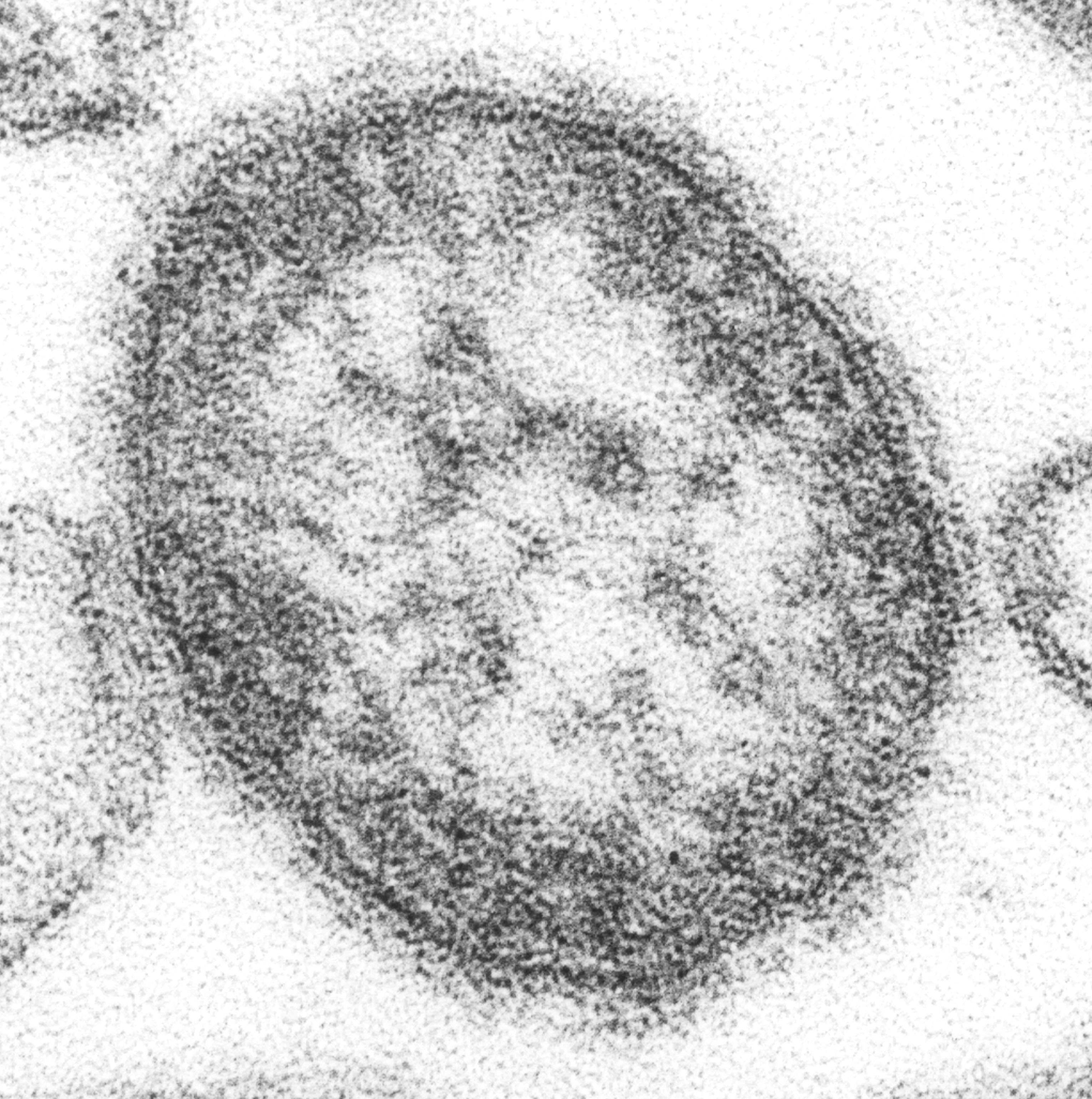
Measles virus is a –ssRNA virus that has a non-segmented genome.

The fifth Baltimore group contains viruses that have a negative-sense, single-stranded RNA (–ssRNA) genome. At least two lineages of –ssRNA viruses exist, which transcribe and replicate their genomes differently. The first are viruses of the phylum Negarnaviricota in the kingdom Orthornavirae, realm Riboviria. Negarnaviricots transcribe mRNA, which is positive sense, directly from the negative-sense genome. The first process for –ssRNA transcription involves the viral RdRp binding to a leader sequence on the 3′-end of the genome, transcribing a 5′ triphosphate-leader RNA sequence, then stopping and restarting on a transcription signal that is capped, continuing until a stop signal is reached. There, the RdRp synthesizes a polyadenylated tail and releases the mRNA or, for polycistronic genomes, continues transcription.

The second manner is similar, but instead of synthesizing a cap, the RdRp may use its endonuclease activity to snatch a short sequence of nucleotides from host cell mRNA and use it as the 5′ cap of viral mRNA. Genomic –ssRNA is replicated from the positive-sense antigenome in a manner similar to transcription, except in reverse using the antigenome as a template for the genome. The RdRp complex moves from the 3′-end to the 5′-end of the antigenome and ignores all transcription signals when synthesizing genomic –ssRNA.

Various –ssRNA viruses use special mechanisms for transcription. The way of polyadenylating the end of an mRNA sequence may be through polymerase stuttering, during which the RdRp transcribes an adenine from uracil and then moves back in the RNA sequence to transcribe it again, continuing this process until hundreds of adenines have been added to the 3′-end of the mRNA. Some –ssRNA viruses are ambisense, as both the positive- and negative-sense strands separately encode viral proteins. These viruses produce one mRNA strand from the genome and one from a complementary strand.

–ssRNA viruses in Negarnaviricota can be divided informally into those that have non-segmented and segmented genomes. Non-segmented –ssRNA viruses replicate in the cytoplasm, and segmented –ssRNA viruses replicate in the nucleus. For segmented viruses, the RdRp transcribes one monocistronic mRNA strand from each segment of the genome. This distinction is closely followed within Negarnaviricota, as viruses in the subphylum Haploviricotina usually have non-segmented genomes, and viruses in the subphylum Polyploviricotina have segmented genomes. Moreover, –ssRNA viruses that synthesize a cap structure on viral mRNA are assigned to Haploviricotina, whereas –ssRNA viruses that snatch caps from host mRNA belong to Polyploviricotina.

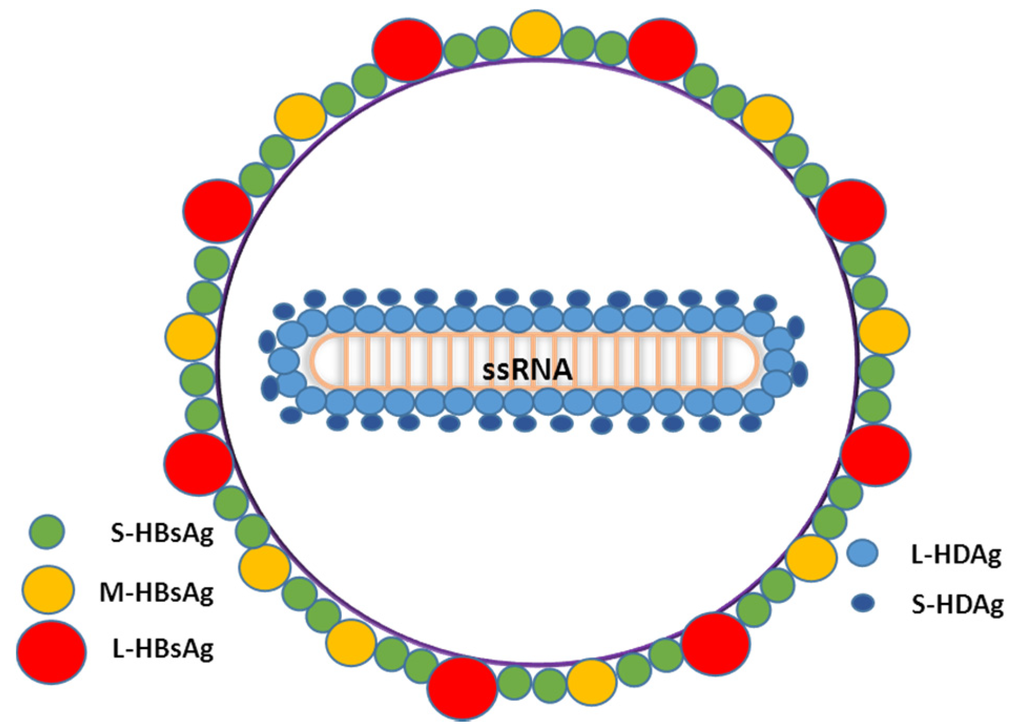
A diagram of Hepatitis D virus, a ribozyvirian. HBsAg proteins are spikes on the viral envelope, and HDAg proteins are nucleoproteins associated with the genome.

The second lineage of –ssRNA viruses is the realm Ribozyviria, which includes Hepatitis D virus (HDV) and its relatives. Ribozyvirians have covalently-closed circular –ssRNA genomes that are covered in nucleocapsid proteins to form a ribonucleoprotein (RNP) complex. After entering a cell, the RNP complex migrates from the cytosol to the nucleus, where the genome is replicated by RCR by a host RNA polymerase II enzyme. This process creates a long molecule with many copies of the genome, called a concatemer, that has a series of positive-sense genomic strands. Ribozymes encoded in this antigenome catalyze cleavage of the concatemer to form individual strands that are either translated or ligated for replication through RCR to produce concatemers of –ssRNA antigenomic strands. Ribozymes encoded in the negative-sense strands then catalyze cleavage of the negative-sense concatemer to produce individual genomic –ssRNA strands. (Note: Kolmioviridae is the only family in the realm Ribozyviria, so descriptions of Kolmioviridae are descriptions of Ribozyviria.)

Lastly, there is a group of –ssRNA viruses assigned to the tentative phylum Arctiviricota in the kingdom Orthornavirae. Arctiviricots inhabit the Arctic Ocean and are believed to represent a separate –ssRNA lineage in Orthornavirae from Negarnaviricota. Their mechanisms of replication and transcription have not been described. In summary, –ssRNA viruses belong to the following taxa:

- In the realm Riboviria, viruses in the phyla Arctiviricota (tentative) and Negarnaviricota are –ssRNA viruses.
- Viruses in the realm Ribozyviria are –ssRNA viruses.

=== Group VI: single-stranded RNA viruses with a DNA intermediate ===
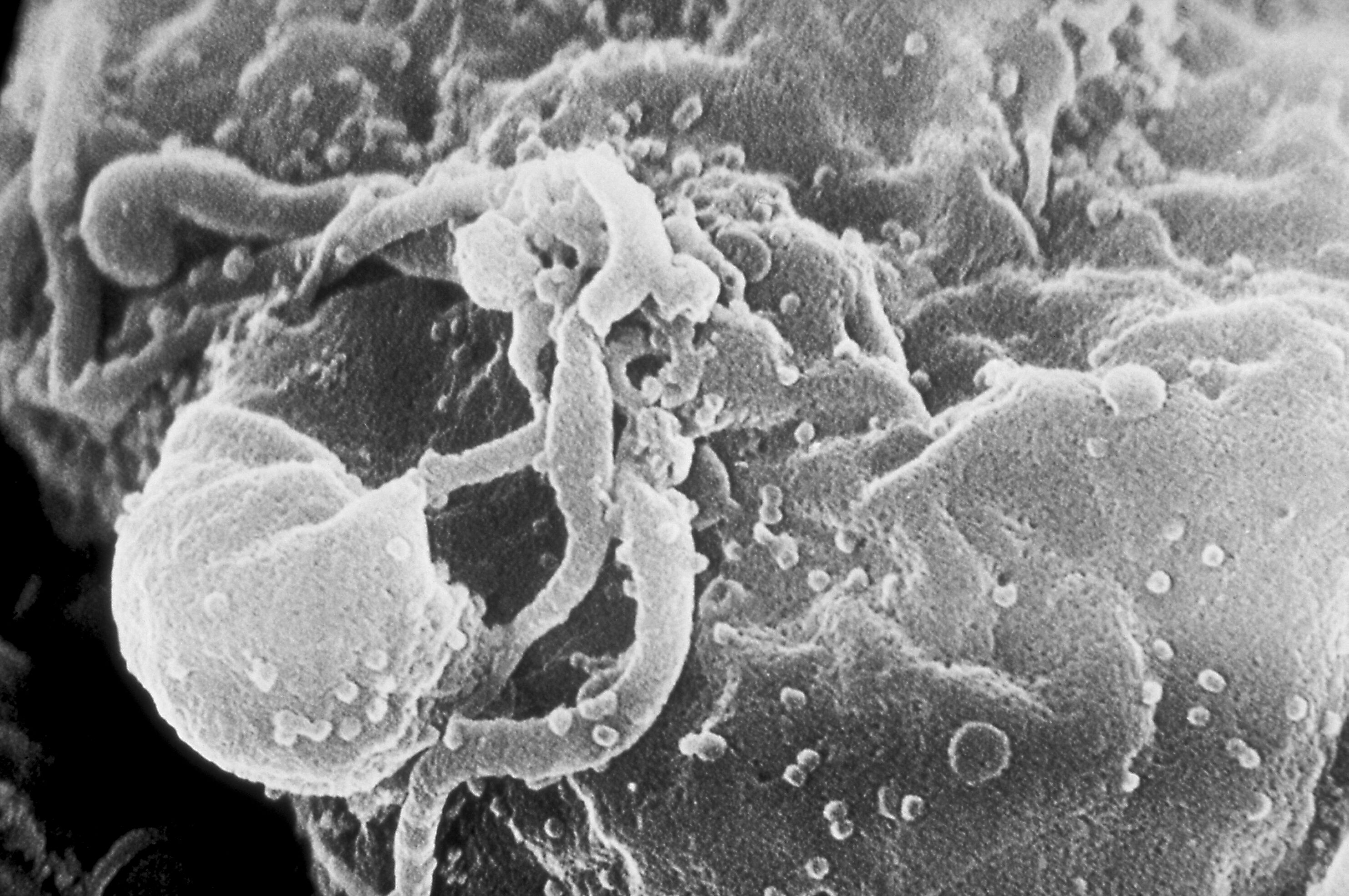
HIV is a ssRNA-RT virus. The small spherical particles are HIV virions budding from an infected cell.

The sixth Baltimore group contains viruses that have a (positive-sense) single-stranded RNA genome with a DNA intermediate ((+)ssRNA-RT) in their replication cycle. ssRNA-RT viruses are transcribed in the same manner as DNA viruses, but their genomes are first converted to a dsDNA form through a process called reverse transcription (RT). The viral reverse transcriptase enzyme then synthesizes a DNA strand from the +ssRNA strand, and the RNA strand is degraded and replaced with a DNA strand to create a dsDNA copy of the genome. The viral enzyme integrase then integrates the dsDNA molecule into the DNA of the host cell, where it is now called a provirus. The host cell's RNA polymerase II then transcribes RNA in the nucleus from the proviral DNA. Some of this RNA becomes mRNA whereas other strands become copies of the viral genome for replication.

ssRNA-RT viruses are all included in the class Revtraviricetes, the sole class in the kingdom Pararnavirae, realm Riboviria. Excluding the family Caulimoviridae, which belongs to group VII, all members of the Revtraviricetes order Ortervirales are ssRNA-RT viruses. ssRNA-RT viruses are sometimes called retroviruses, a term shared with members of the ssRNA-RT family Retroviridae.

=== Group VII: double-stranded DNA viruses with an RNA intermediate ===
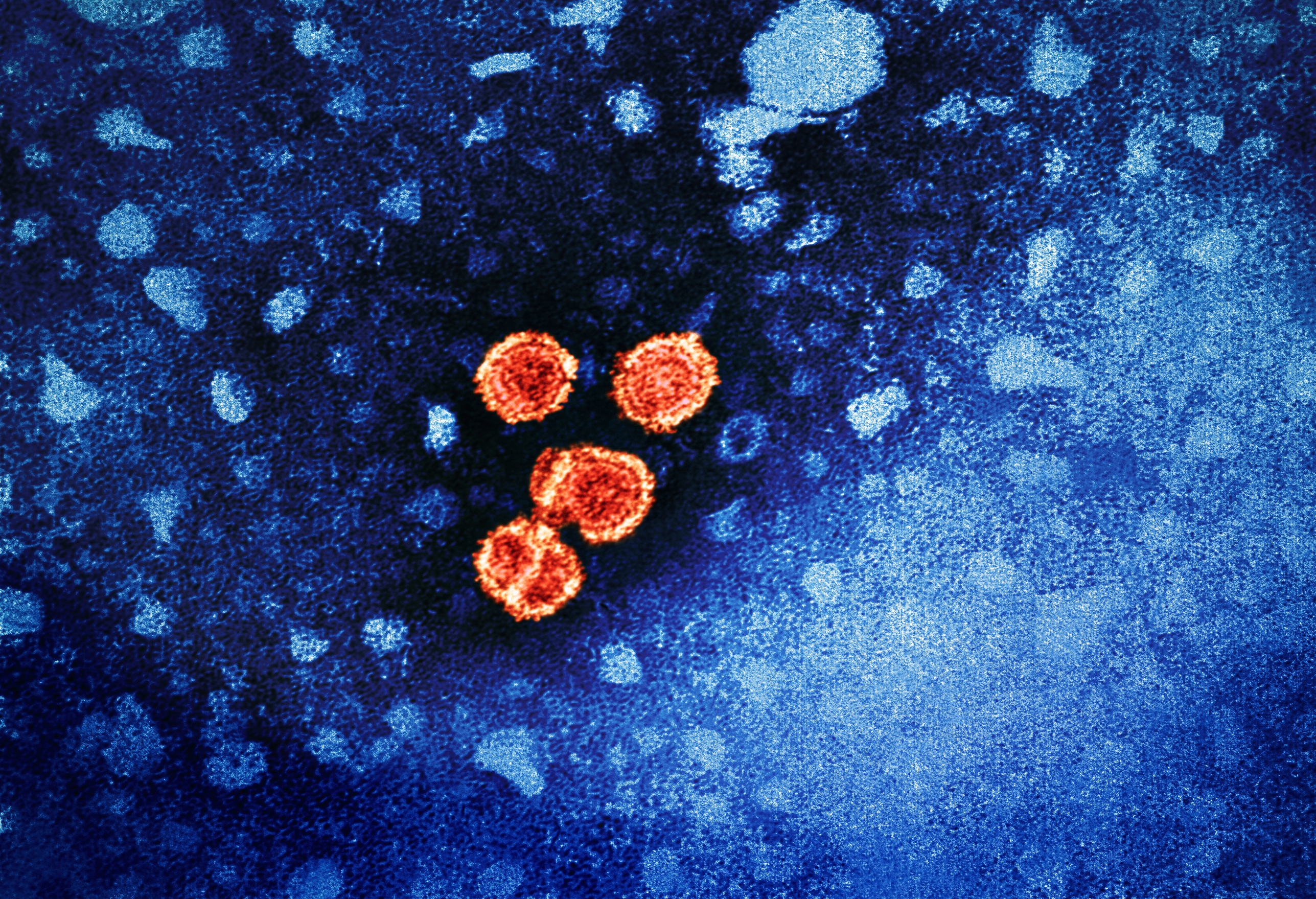
Hepatitis B virus is a dsDNA-RT virus.

The seventh Baltimore group contains viruses that have a double-stranded DNA genome with an RNA intermediate (dsDNA-RT) in their replication cycle. dsDNA-RT viruses have gaps in their circular genomes so that parts of the genome are ssDNA. These gaps are repaired to create a complete, covalently-closed circular dsDNA genome before transcription. The host cell's RNA polymerase II then transcribes RNA strands from the genome in the nucleus. The viral enzyme reverse transcriptase then produces dsDNA from pregenomic RNA (pgRNA) strands by the same general mechanism as ssRNA-RT viruses, but with replication occurring in a loop around the circular genome. Replication occurs after pgRNA is packaged into capsids and before capsids bud from the cell.

dsDNA-RT viruses are, like ssRNA-RT viruses, all included in the class Revtraviricetes. Two families of dsDNA-RT viruses are recognized: Caulimoviridae, which belongs to the order Ortervirales, and Hepadnaviridae, which is the sole family in the order Blubervirales. The provisional family Nudnaviridae is considered to be a sister family to hepadnavirids. dsDNA-RT viruses are often called pararetroviruses.

== Multi-group viruses ==
Some viruses can be classified into two Baltimore groups. Pleolipoviruses, for example, encapsidate either ssDNA or dsDNA genomes. For betapleolipoviruses, an encapsidated genome contains ssDNA regions and dsDNA regions. Similarly, bacilladnaviruses are ssDNA viruses with short dsDNA regions in their genomes. Therefore, both pleolipoviruses and bacilladnaviruses can be considered both dsDNA and ssDNA viruses. Ambisense RNA viruses also exist: certain bunyaviruses, such as arenaviruses, contain segmented genomes in which one segment is partly positive sense and partly negative sense. Furthermore, RNA viruses of the phylum Ambiviricota have non-segmented genomes with at least two open reading frames (ORFs). One is encoded on the positive-sense strand and the other on the negative-sense strand. These RNA viruses may constitute a new Baltimore group, or they can be considered both +ssRNA and –ssRNA viruses.

== Correlates to Baltimore groups ==
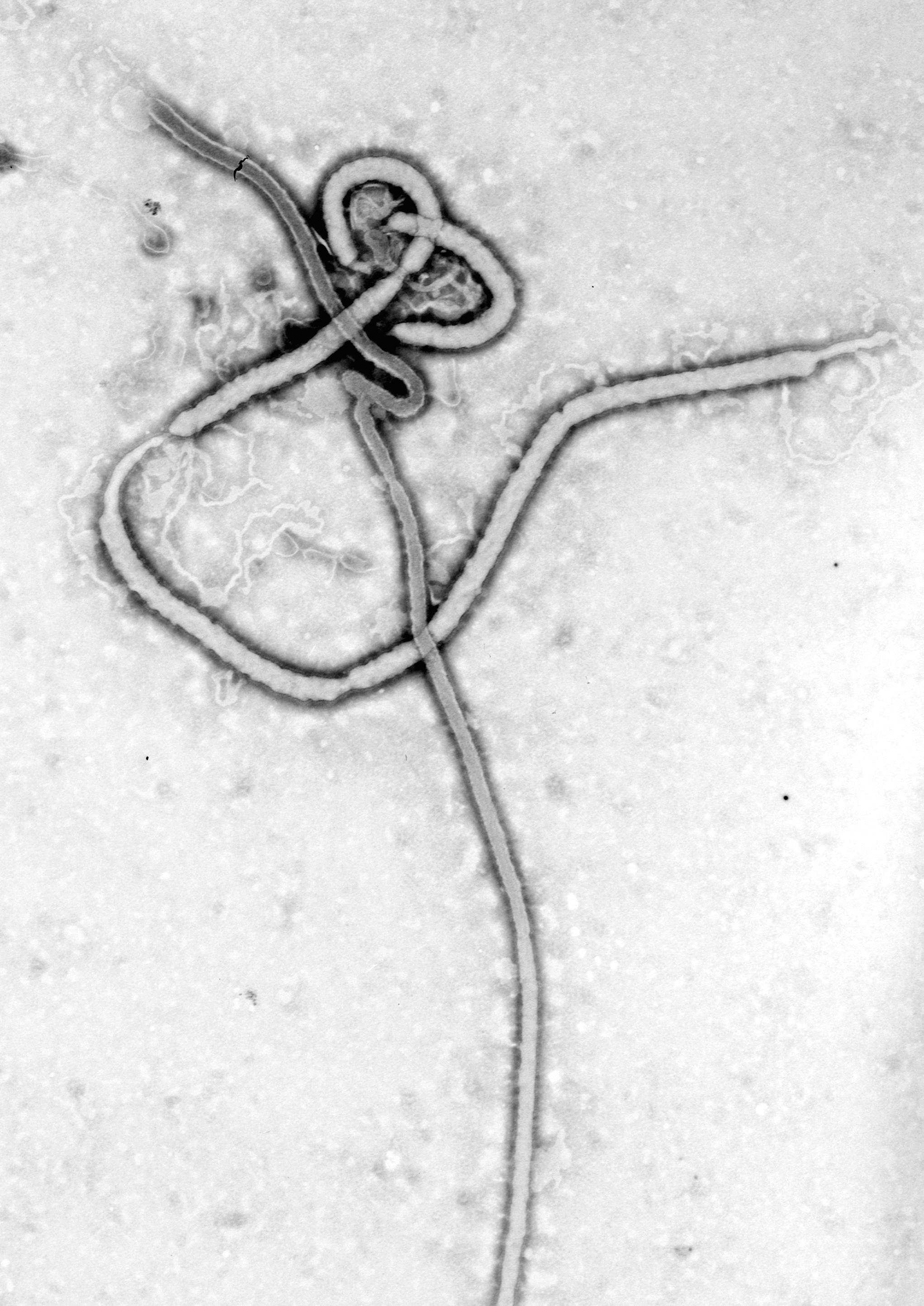
Ebola viruses, which are –ssRNA viruses, make use of RNA editing.

Many characteristics of viruses do not define which Baltimore group a virus belongs to but still correspond to specific Baltimore groups. This includes the use of RNA editing, alternative splicing during transcription, whether the virus's genome is segmented, the size and structure of the virus's genome, the host range of viruses, whether the virus packages replication and transcription machinery into virions, and unorthodox methods of translating mRNA.

=== RNA editing ===
RNA editing is used by various ssRNA viruses to produce different proteins from a single gene. This can be done by polymerase slippage during transcription or by post-transcriptional editing. During polymerase slippage, the RNA polymerase slips one nucleotide back during transcription, which adds a nucleotide not included in the template strand to the mRNA strand. Editing of a genomic template would impair gene expression, so RNA editing is only done during and after transcription. For ebola viruses, RNA editing is used to express three different proteins from a single gene, which increases their ability to adapt to their hosts.

=== Alternative splicing ===
Alternative splicing is a mechanism by which different proteins can be produced from a single gene by using alternative splicing sites to produce different mRNA strands. It is used by various DNA, –ssRNA, and reverse transcribing viruses. Viruses may make use of alternative splicing solely to produce multiple proteins from a single pre-mRNA strand or for other specific purposes. For some viruses, such as papillomaviruses, alternative splicing acts as a way to regulate early and late gene expression during different stages of infection. Herpesviruses use it as a potential anti-host defense mechanism to prevent synthesis of specific antiviral proteins.

Alternative splicing differs from RNA editing in that alternative splicing does not change the mRNA sequence like RNA editing but instead changes the coding capacity of an mRNA sequence as a result of alternative splicing sites. The two processes otherwise have the same result: multiple proteins are expressed from a single gene.

=== Genome segmentation ===
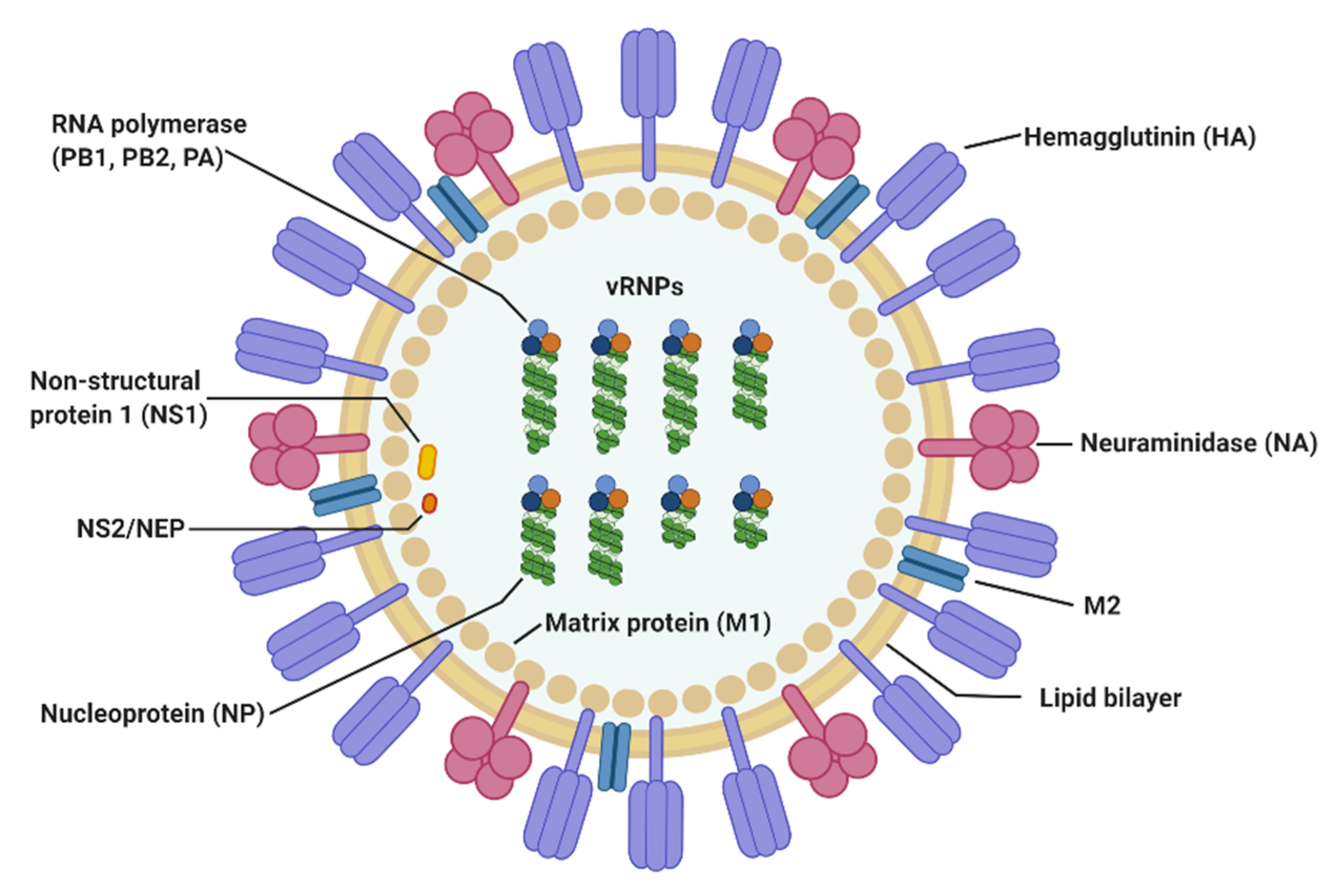
A diagram of the Influenza A virus virion, the eight-segment genome shown in the center as part of ribonucleoprotein complexes

Viral genomes can exist as a single (monopartite) segment, a segmented genome, or a multipartite genome. For monopartite viruses, all genes are on a single genome segment. For segmented viruses, the genome is separated into at least two molecules that are packaged together into one virion. Multipartite viruses are segmented viruses that package their genome segments into separate virions. Monopartite and segmented viruses are found in all cellular life, whereas multipartite viruses mainly infect plants and fungi. By Baltimore group, dsDNA and RT viruses are non-segmented, ssDNA and +ssRNA viruses are mostly non-segmented, dsRNA viruses are mostly segmented, and around half of –ssRNA viruses are segmented. Pleolipoviruses vary as some have monopartite ssDNA genomes while others are bipartite with one ssDNA segment and one dsDNA segment. Viruses in the ssDNA plant virus family Geminiviridae likewise vary between being monopartite and bipartite.

=== Genome structure ===
Viral genomes may be either linear with ends or circular in a loop. Whether a virus has a linear or circular genome varies from group to group. Most dsDNA and –ssRNA viruses have linear genomes, ssDNA viruses mainly have circular genomes, dsRNA, +ssRNA, and ssRNA-RT viruses have linear genomes, and dsDNA-RT viruses have circular genomes. As all +ssRNA viruses have genomes that can act as mRNA, and circular mRNA does not exist in cellular life, all +ssRNA viruses have linear genomes. Among –ssRNA viruses, those of the phylum Negarnaviricota have linear genomes, and those of the realm Ribozyviria have circular genomes.

=== Genome size ===
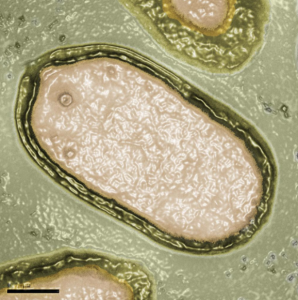
Pandoravirus salinus, a dsDNA virus, has the largest known genome of any virus at about 2,470 kilobases.

The size, or length, of a genome varies by Baltimore group. dsDNA viruses have genomes ranging from about 5 to 2,500 kilobases (kb) in length, ssDNA viruses 1–25 kb, dsRNA viruses 4–30 kb, +ssRNA viruses 3.5–40 kb, –ssRNA viruses 1.7–20 kb, ssRNA-RT viruses 5–13 kb, and dsDNA-RT viruses 3–10 kb in length. The relatively small genomes of viruses that are not group I are likely due to physical limitations. For example, ssDNA has the potential to form extensive secondary structures, and ssRNA is relatively chemically unstable. dsDNA viruses have much more varied genome sizes, likely because they have the same genomic organization as cells. This enables them to either exploit cellular machinery or encode their own machinery. As such, dsDNA seems to be the only genomic organization that can support genomes that exceed about 50 kb.

=== Host range ===
Different Baltimore groups tend to be found within different branches of cellular life. The vast majority of dsDNA viruses infect prokaryotes, but they also infect protists, animals, and rarely fungi. ssDNA viruses infect bacteria and most eukaryotes but are rare in archaea. dsRNA viruses infect plants, protists, and animals, are rare in bacteria, but are not found in archaea. +ssRNA viruses are found in all eukaryotes, infect many bacteria, but do not infect archaea. –ssRNA viruses infect animals and plants, are rare in fungi, but are not found in prokaryotes. ssRNA-RT viruses infect all eukaryotes but do not infect prokaryotes. Lastly, dsDNA-RT viruses infect animals and plants but not prokaryotes. Whether dsDNA-RT viruses infect protists is unknown.

By host, a large majority of prokaryotic viruses are dsDNA viruses, but a significant minority are ssDNA and +ssRNA viruses. There are a relatively small number of prokaryotic dsRNA viruses and no prokaryotic –ssRNA or RT viruses. Eukaryotic viruses, in contrast, are predominantly RNA viruses, though eukaryotic DNA viruses are common. Well-characterized eukaryotic viromes contain mostly +ssRNA viruses and, in some lineages such as fungi, dsRNA viruses. ssRNA-RT viruses are also common in eukaryotes, especially in animals.

Biological factors influence host range. For example, dsDNA viruses do not infect plants because large dsDNA molecules are unable to pass through plasmodesmata, intercellular channels that connect plant cells. The dominance of DNA viruses in prokaryotes may be because they outcompete RNA viruses. In eukaryotic cells, however, the nucleus is a barrier that requires adaptation by DNA viruses. They either have to evolve means to enter the nucleus to replicate or obtain their own replication and transcription machinery to replicate in virus factories in the cytosol. In contrast, the endomembranes of eukaryotic cells appear to be a beneficial environment for RNA virus replication.

=== Packaging of replication and transcription machinery ===
A diagram of the immature and mature virions of gammaretroviruses. The viral enzymes reverse transcriptase and integrase, essential for replication, are packaged into virions.

Viruses often package into the virion machineries necessary for replication and transcription, varying by Baltimore group. dsDNA viruses sometimes package transcription machinery, ssDNA and +ssRNA viruses do not package either replication or transcription machinery, dsRNA and +ssRNA-RT viruses package both, –ssRNA viruses package almost everything, and dsDNA-RT viruses package most components of their replication and transcription machinery.

dsDNA viruses encode a broad range of proteins involved in replication and transcription. In some cases, they encode nearly complete systems that grant the virus partial autonomy from cells during genome expression and replication. Most ssDNA viruses encode an endonuclease that initiates RCR or RHR while relying on host cell machinery for the rest of replication and transcription. The endonuclease has to be encoded by these viruses because they use a DNA replication method not normally used by cells. Anelloviruses and bidnaviruses are the exceptions: anelloviruses encode proteins that aren't homologous to known proteins, and bidnaviruses encode a protein-primed DNA polymerase.

RNA replication and reverse transcription are usually discouraged by cells, which necessitates that all RNA and RT viruses encode their own RNA-dependent polymerase. Satellite viruses, such as the viruses of Ribozyviria, are the only exception because they depend on other viruses for replication. Almost all RNA and RT viruses incorporate their RNA-dependent polymerase into the virion because the enzyme is required to synthesize viral mRNA in infected cells. The exceptions are +ssRNA viruses and caulimoviruses, which are dsDNA-RT viruses. +ssRNA viruses do not do so because their genomes function as mRNA and are translated upon cell entry. For caulimoviruses, the host enzyme RNA polymerase II transcribes the genome.

=== Translation ===
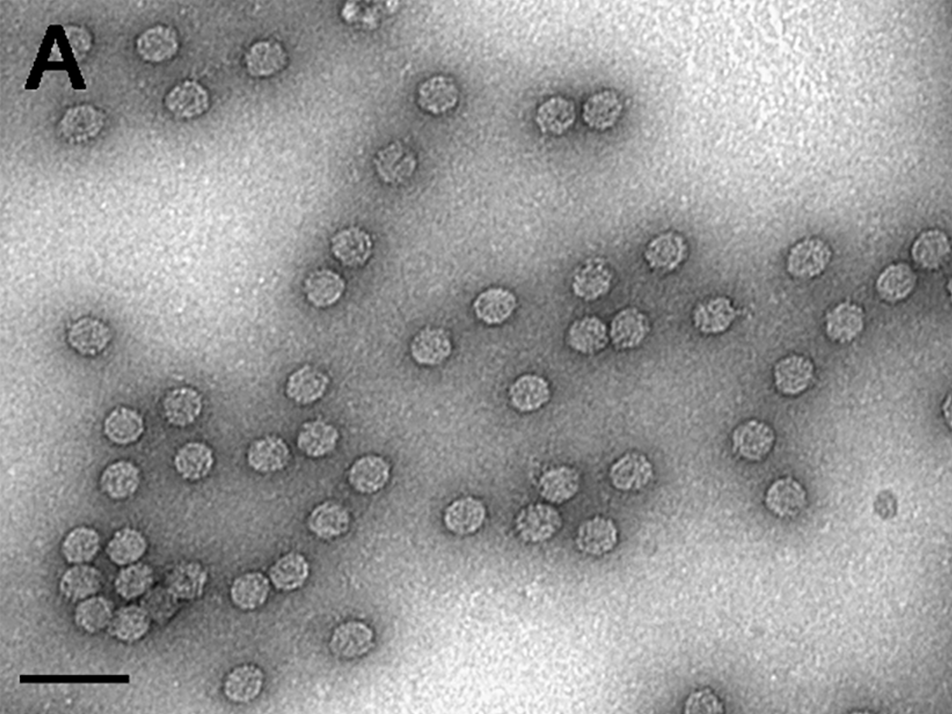
Cauliflower mosaic virus, a dsDNA-RT virus, uses ribosomal shunting.

Translation is the process by which proteins are synthesized from mRNA by ribosomes. Baltimore groups do not directly pertain to the translation of viral mRNA to proteins, but atypical types of translation used by viruses are usually found within specific Baltimore groups. For example:

- Non-canonical translation initiation:
  - Viral initiation of translation: some viruses have evolved mechanisms to initiate translation. Methods include having internal ribosomal entry sites to allow cap-independent initiation, having downstream hairpin loops that allow for cap-dependent translation without an eIF2 initiation factor, and initiating translation at a CUG codon or other start codon with a leucine amino acid. These methods are used by various +ssRNA and ssRNA-RT viruses.
  - Ribosomal shunting, also called nonlinear scanning: ribosomes start scanning from a 5′-cap structure then bypass a leader region in the mRNA and initiate translation downstream from the leader sequence. Ribosomal shunting is used by various dsDNA, +ssRNA, –ssRNA, and RT viruses.
  - Termination-reinitiation, also called stop-start: after termination of translation of an ORF, a proportion of 40S subunits of the ribosome remain attached to the mRNA as a way to reinitiate translation of a subsequent ORF. This is used by various dsRNA and +ssRNA viruses.

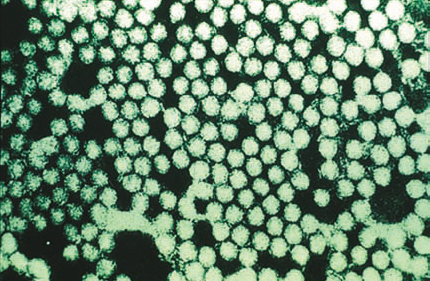
Foot-and-mouth disease virus, a +ssRNA virus, uses ribosomal skipping.

- Non-canonical elongation and termination of translation:
  - Ribosomal frameshifting: ribosomes slip one nucleobase forward or backward during translation. This is used by various dsDNA, dsRNA, +ssRNA, and ssRNA-RT viruses to produce merged proteins from overlapping ORFs.
  - Suppression of termination, also called stop codon read-through: certain viruses contain codons in their mRNA that would normally signal for termination of translation upon being recognized by a release factor but are instead partially recognized by tRNA during translation, which allows for continued translation up to the next stop codon to produce extended polypeptides at the end of the amino acid sequence. This is used by various dsRNA, +ssRNA, and ssRNA-RT viruses, often to express replicase enzymes.
  - Ribosomal skipping, also called stop-carry on and stop-go: a viral peptide may prevent a ribosome from covalently linking a newly inserted amino acid, which blocks further translation. The amino acid sequence is then co-translationally cleaved, and a new amino acid sequence is started, which leads to the production of two proteins from one ORF. This is used by various dsRNA and +ssRNA viruses.

== Evolutionary origins and relations ==
Diagram of a bacterium showing chromosomal DNA and plasmids, not to scale. Most ssDNA viruses are likely descended from plasmids.

Excluding ribozyvirians, RNA viruses of groups III–V are believed to share common ancestry. +ssRNA viruses form the basal, ancestral lineage of these viruses from which dsRNA viruses and –ssRNA viruses appear to have evolved from on multiple occasions. The two orders of RT viruses in the class Revtraviricetes, Blubervirales and Ortervirales, are believed by virologists to have evolved from two different families of retrotransposons on separate occasions. ssRNA-RT viruses all belong to Ortervirales and thus share common ancestry. dsDNA-RT viruses, on the other hand, are found in both orders and therefore represent two separate lineages of dsDNA-RT viruses. Ribozyvirians constitute a lineage of –ssRNA viruses unrelated to other RNA viruses.

Most ssDNA viruses likely originate from plasmids that, on multiple occasions, recombined with other genomes to obtain the structural proteins needed to form virions. The evolutionary history of dsDNA viruses is the most complex as they appear to have emerged independently on numerous occasions. Two major lineages of dsDNA viruses exist: the realm Duplodnaviria and the realm Varidnaviria, the latter of which also contains ssDNA viruses that are descended from dsDNA viruses. The opposite is true in the realm Floreoviria, which contains dsDNA viruses descended from ssDNA viruses. There are also two minor realms, Adnaviria and Singelaviria, that exclusively contain dsDNA viruses. Lastly, there are dsDNA virus families unassigned to higher taxa that are unique from existing realms and which likely constitute small realms.

Of the replication-expression systems used by viruses, only Baltimore group I (dsDNA) is used by cells. The other groups may be remnants of the primordial stage of life before the emergence of modern-like cells, during which the dsDNA system used by extant cells had not yet become uniform. The ancestors of RNA viruses in particular may have emerged during the time of the RNA world. And although virus realms are evolutionarily independent from each other, the replicative proteins encoded by viruses in the four major realms (Duplodnaviria, Floreoviria, Riboviria, and Varidnaviria) are built on the core RNA recognition motif, one of the most common nucleic acid-binding domains in nature. Therefore, the replication-expression cycles most likely diversified before the separation of large dsDNA replicators, which became the ancestors of cellular life, from other types of replicators, which became selfish genetic elements and gave rise to viruses.

== History ==
David Baltimore in 2021

Before Baltimore classification was created, a variety of classification systems for viruses had been proposed, classifying viruses by host, structure, biochemical properties, and other characteristics. Baltimore classification was proposed in 1971 by virologist David Baltimore in a paper titled "Expression of Animal Virus Genomes" that was published in the academic journal Bacteriology Reviews (now named Microbiology and Molecular Biology Reviews). Baltimore focused on classifying animal viruses but effectively classified all viruses by their routes of information transmission from genomic nucleic acid to mRNA. The system initially contained the first six groups but was later expanded to include group VII after the discovery of dsDNA-RT viruses. Because of the utility of Baltimore classification, it came to be used alongside standard virus taxonomy, which is based on evolutionary relationships and governed by the International Committee on Taxonomy of Viruses (ICTV).

Over time, the belief that Baltimore groups were monophyletic spread among virologists. This was reflected in taxonomies published by the ICTV and the National Center for Biotechnology Information, which for decades placed the Baltimore groups as informal higher ranks above official taxonomic ranks. From 1991 to 2017, virus taxonomy used a five-rank system ranging from order to species, with Baltimore classification used in conjunction. Outside of official taxonomy, supergroups of viruses joining different taxa were created over time based on increasing evidence of deeper evolutionary relations. The advancement of sequencing methods in the 21st century in particular made it possible to study virus evolution and diversity in greater detail. This enabled virologists to better understand the relationships between Baltimore groups and the evolutionary history of viruses. Consequently, in 2016, the ICTV began to consider establishing ranks higher than order as well as how the Baltimore groups would be treated among higher taxa.

In two votes in 2018 and 2019, the ICTV established a 15-rank system ranging from realm to species. As part of this, the Baltimore groups for ssDNA, dsRNA, +ssRNA, –ssRNA, and RT viruses were incorporated into formal taxa. In 2019, the realm Riboviria was established and initially included all dsRNA, +ssRNA, and –ssRNA viruses. A year later, Riboviria was expanded to also include RT viruses. Within the realm, RT viruses are included in the kingdom Pararnavirae and the three other Baltimore groups in the kingdom Orthornavirae as defining traits of the kingdom's phyla. While –ssRNA viruses of Ribozyviria were initially classified in Riboviria, this was a clerical error that was fixed in 2020. A year later, Ribozyviria was established for HDV and its relatives. For ssDNA viruses, the realm Monodnaviria was established in 2020 to accommodate almost all ssDNA viruses, as well as dsDNA viruses descended from them. In 2026, however, Monodnaviria was split into four realms (Efunaviria, Floreoviria, Pleomoviria, and Volvereviria) based on evidence that its four kingdoms did not share common ancestry.

In 1974, virologist Vadim Agol proposed an extension of Baltimore classification to encompass all possible means of genetic information transmission and describe the hierarchical routes of information transmission, including both expression and replication, rather than solely mRNA synthesis. In the expanded system, there are 35 classes, 17 superclasses, and six types of genetic information transfer. The system was revisited in 2021 by Koonin et al. in light of discoveries made since the 1970s. Known viruses occupy 13 classes, one of which is shared with cells, seven superclasses, and three types. A fourteenth class is occupied by F-like plasmids. Ambisense viruses occupy two classes simultaneously, though separate classes could be made for them. Most unoccupied classes are of DNA-RNA hybrids, which appear to be disfavored by evolution since it may be advantageous to convert such molecules to dsDNA, the molecule most suitable for genome replication. According to Koonin et al., viruses that belong to the unoccupied classes are unlikely to be discovered unless they are rare in nature.
