= Haloarcula hispanica SH1 virus =

Haloarcula hispanica virus SH1

Virus classification
- (unranked): Virus
- Realm: Singelaviria
- Kingdom: Helvetiavirae
- Phylum: Dividoviricota
- Class: Laserviricetes
- Order: Halopanivirales
- Family: Sphaerolipoviridae
- Genus: Alphasphaerolipovirus
- Species: Haloarcula hispanica virus SH1

Species of virus

Haloarcula hispanica SH1 virus is a double-stranded DNA virus that infects the archaeon Haloarcula hispanica.

== Virology ==
There are 15 structural proteins in the capsid varying in molecular weight between 185 kilodaltons (kDa) and 4 kDa. These have been numbered from VP1 to VP 15. Seven appear to be minor components (VP5, VP6, VP8, VP11, VP13, VP14 and VP15).

VP12 (molecular weight 9.8 kDa) has two membrane spanning helices suggesting it is an integral membrane protein.

VP2 may be an elongated fiber like protein suitable for forming a spike.

The lipid membrane contains phosphatidylglycerol, phosphatidylglycerophosphate methyl ester and phosphatidylglycerosulfate.

== Genome ==
The genome is linear 30,898 base pairs in length and contains 309 base pair inverted terminal repeat sequences. The G+C content is 68.4%. It encodes 56 open reading frames (ORFs).

The structural proteins correspond to the ORFs as follows:

- ORF13 – VP1
- ORF23 – VP12
- ORF24 – VP7
- ORF25 – VP4
- ORF27 – VP13
- ORF28 – VP2
- ORF29 – VP5
- ORF30 – VP10
- ORF31 – VP9
- ORF32 – VP3
- ORF33 – VP6

All the structural proteins are located in the middle of the genome.

ORF 17 encodes a protein with an ATPase domain.
