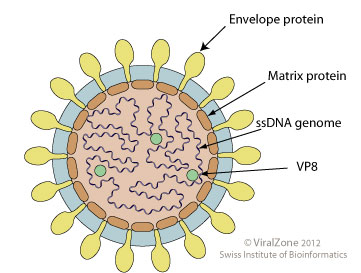
- Alphapleolipovirus virion (cross section)

Virus classification
- (unranked): Virus
- Realm: Monodnaviria
- Kingdom: Trapavirae
- Phylum: Saleviricota
- Class: Huolimaviricetes
- Order: Haloruvirales
- Family: Pleolipoviridae
- Genus: Alphapleolipovirus
- Species: Alphapleolipovirus HHPV1

Synonyms
- Haloarcula hispanica pleomorphic virus 1; HHPV-1; Haloarcula virus HHPV(-)1

= Haloarcula hispanica pleomorphic virus 1 =

Alphapleolipovirus HHPV1

Alphapleolipovirus HHPV1, also known as Haloarcula hispanica pleomorphic virus 1 (HHPV-1) is a virus of the family Pleolipoviridae. It is a double stranded DNA virus that infects the halophilic archaeon Haloarcula hispanica. It has a number of unique features unlike any previously described virus.

== Virology ==
The virions are enveloped and pleomorphic is shape. The envelope contains a variety of lipids including cardiolipins, phosphatidylglycerols, phosphatidylglycerophosphate methyl esters and phosphatidylglycerosulfates. There are two major proteins in the envelope — VP3 (12 kilodaltons in weight) and VP4 (60 kilodaltons in weight).

The virions exit the host without lysis suggesting a budding mechanism.

== Genome ==
The genome is a single molecule of double stranded DNA, circular, 8082 base pairs in length with a G+C content of 55.8%. It has eight open reading frames (ORFs). VP3 and VP4 are encoded by ORF3 and ORF4 respectively.

ORF1 is probably a replication initiation protein. ORF3 encodes an integral membrane protein with a 50 amino acid signal sequence and two transmembrane regions. Before the C-terminal transmembrane domain is a coiled-coil region. ORF7 contains a NTPase domain but its function is not clear.

== Taxonomy ==
Examination of the proteins and genome organisation of this virus suggests that it related to the single stranded DNA virus Halorubrum pleomorphic virus 1, the plasmid pHK2 and a region within the archeon Haloferax volcanii. It seems likely that the plasmid pHK2 may be a virus that can form circular plasmids and that the region within Haloferax volcanii is a prophage.
