= Lists of virus taxa =

Virus classification showing major ranks

This is an index of lists of virus taxa.

== By taxonomic rank ==
- List of higher virus taxa, i.e. all taxa above the rank of family
- List of virus families and subfamilies
- List of virus genera (also includes subgenera)
