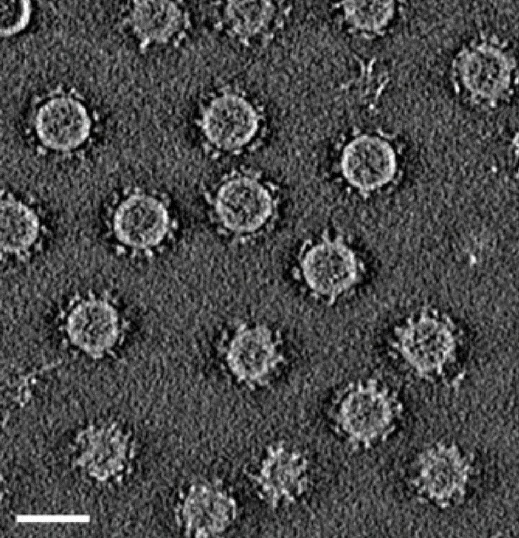
- Cryo-electron tomography of Halorubrum pleomorphic virus 6 (HRPV-6), Alphapleolipovirus samutsakhonense, a pleolipovirus
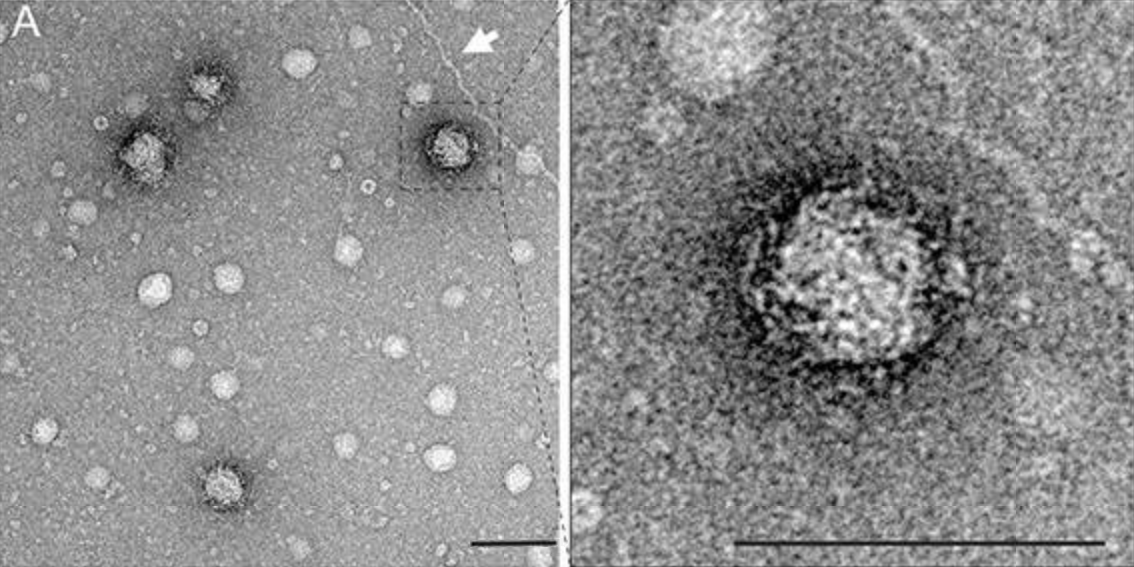
- Electron micrograph of Archaeoglobus veneficus pleomorphic virus 1 (AvPV1), Avenivirus atlanticense, a thalassapleovirus

Virus classification
- (unranked): Virus
- Realm: Pleomoviria
- Kingdom: Trapavirae

Subtaxa
- See text

= Pleomoviria =

Realm of viruses

Pleomoviria is a realm of archaeal viruses that encode a unique V-shaped membrane fusion protein and internal membrane matrix proteins that are attached to the viral envelope, which surrounds the genome and has spikes protruding from its surface. Pleomovirian genomes are either circular double-stranded DNA (dsDNA) molecules, linear dsDNA, or circular single-stranded DNA (ssDNA). Regardless of genome type, pleomovirians have a conserved group of core genes that are in the same order. The extracellular particles (virions) of pleomovirians consist of the genome and the envelope. Virions have a pseudo-spherical, pleomorphic shape that is uneven and variable in shape. Pleomovirians do not have a capsid, nucleocapsid, or nucleoproteins.

Viruses in Pleomoviria infect archaea through fusion of the envelope with the host cell membrane. The fusion protein, which forms the spikes on the envelope, mediates this process. Pleomovirians do not have a shared replication method, as genome replication occurs through various processes, including rolling circle replication and protein-primed replication. Virions are assembled as the virus buds from the surface of the host cell's membrane, which it uses to form its envelope. Infection is persistent, and virions are continually produced from the cell without lysis. It is common for pleomovirians to become integrated into the genome of their host. Switching between having a dsDNA and ssDNA genome, even if rarely, also appears to occur, as does horizontal gene transfer between pleomovirians and archaeal plasmids.

Pleomovirians are not related to viruses outside the realm. Three groups of viruses in the realm have been classified: pleolipoviruses, nanopleoviruses, and thalassapleoviruses. Pleolipoviruses and nanopleoviruses infect archaea that inhabit environments with very high salinity, and thalassapleoviruses infect archaea that live in very high temperature environments. Unclassified pleomovirians have been found that infect methanogenic archaea. The first pleomovirian to be discovered was the pleolipovirus Halorubrum pleomorphic virus 1 in 2009. Thalassapleoviruses were first described in 2024 and nanopleoviruses in 2025. Originally, pleomovirians were classified in the realm Monodnaviria in the kingdom Trapavirae, which was created in 2020. In 2026, Monodnaviria was split into four realms corresponding to its four kingdoms after evidence showed that its kingdoms were not related to each other. This gave Trapavirae its own realm, Pleomoviria.

== Classification ==
Pleomoviria is monotypic down to the rank of its sole kingdom, Trapavirae, which has two phyla. This is shown hereafter:

- Realm: Pleomoviria
  - Kingdom: Trapavirae
    - Phylum: Calorviricota, which contains thalassapleoviruses
    - Phylum: Saleviricota, which contains nanopleoviruses and pleolipoviruses

== Characteristics ==
=== Genome ===
Pleomovirian genomes vary in structure. Pleolipovirus genomes have been observed to be circular single-stranded DNA (ssDNA), circular dsDNA, and linear dsDNA. More specifically, alphapleolipovirus genomes are either circular dsDNA or circular ssDNA, betapleolipoviruses have circular dsDNA genomes that may be partly ssDNA, and gammapleolipoviruses have linear genomes with inverted terminal repeats and proteins attached to the end of the genome. Circular ssDNA genomes are 7–11 thousand nucleotides in length, circular dsDNA genomes 8–17 thousand base pairs long, and linear dsDNA genomes about 16,000 base pairs in length. Archaeoglobus veneficus pleomorphic virus 1 (AvPV1), a characterized thalassapleovirus, has a circular dsDNA genome.

=== Proteins ===
Pleomovirians encode one or two types of spike protein and one or two types of internal membrane protein, These internal membrane proteins are hydrophobic matrix proteins with several predicted transmembrane regions. The spike protein of pleomovirians is an archaea-specific membrane fusion protein with a unique V-shaped folded structure. Additionally, both pleolipoviruses and thalassapleoviruses encode a putative NTPase. Other non-structural proteins encoded by pleolipoviruses include proteins that initiate rolling circle replication in alphapleolipoviruses, a putative type B DNA polymerase in gammapleolipoviruses, and an integrase in some betapleolipoviruses. Thelassapleoviruses similarly encode at least two integrases.

=== Structure ===
The extracellular virus particles (virions) of pleomovirians consist of the genome contained inside a flexible, pleomorphic lipid membrane vesicle (a viral envelope). The lipids of the vesicle are derived from the host cell membrane, so its composition is similar to the host archaeon's surface membrane. The vesicle is about 40–70 nanometers in diameter and may be round and pseudo-spherical or elongated in shape. The membrane has spikes protruding from its surface that are distributed randomly. These spikes are anchored to the membrane through a C-terminal transmembrane domain. There are also essential membrane proteins on the interior of the envelope. Pleomovirians do not have a capsid, nucleocapsid, or nucleoproteins.

=== Life cycle ===
Pleolipoviruses enter cells by membrane fusion of the viral envelope with the host cell's cytoplasmic membrane. This fusion is mediated by viral spike proteins on the envelope, allowing the genome to enter the cell. Once inside a cell, pleomovirians replicate their genome through a variety of methods. Pleolipoviruses that have circular genomes are predicted to use rolling circle replication (RCR) and those that have linear genomes are predicted to use protein-primed replication, but this has not been confirmed experimentally. Alphapleolipoviruses encode HUH superfamily endonucleases involved in RCR, and gammapleolipoviruses encode a protein-primed family B DNA polymerase. Betapleolipoviruses, however, do not encode recognizable replication proteins, with the exception of Danakil Halobacteriales pleomorphic virus 1, which encodes an RCR endonuclease. Some thalassapleoviruses encode a putative RCR initiator protein, while others do not encode recognizable replication proteins.

Pleolipoviruses establish a persistent infection, continually releasing virions from infected cells without lysis. They are presumed to exit host cells by budding from the surface of the cell. During virion assembly, lipids are acquired from the host cell membrane. Pleolipoviruses are not selective when acquiring lipids, so formation of the virion results in an asymmetric shape and various genome types and genome packaging densities. During infection, host cell growth may be reduced.

Some pleolipoviruses encode a putative integrase, which enables them to have a temperate life cycle in which they become integrated into the host cell's genome. Pleolipovirus-like proviruses have been discovered that encode a tyrosine recombinase. These viruses appear to integrate by tyrosine-mediated recombination between attP sites on the viral genome and the attB site located within the 3′ ("three prime") distal region of cellular transfer RNA genes. After integration, the viral genome is flanked by hybrid attachment sites attL and attR. This method is used by SNJ2, which encodes a predicted tyrosine integrase.

=== Evolution ===
The variation in genome type among pleolipoviruses suggests that switching between dsDNA and ssDNA is a recurring event for pleolipoviruses, even if it does not happen frequently. Horizontal gene transfer between pleolipoviruses and archaeal plasmids also appears to occur. For example, their HUH endonucleases are not monophyletic and show relation to different archaeal plasmid families. Pleomovirian lineages are associated with specific archaean lineages, indicating deep evolutionary divergence from their common ancestor and co-evolution with their hosts.

== Distribution ==
Pleolipoviruses infect archaea of the class Halobacteria, which inhabit environments with very high levels of salinity. Their geographic distribution is wide, but they are restricted to hypersaline environments, including solar salterns and hypersaline lakes. Furthermore, they have narrow host ranges, infecting only the species they were found infecting at the time of their discovery. Proviral sequences related to pleolipoviruses are common in the genomes of halophilic archaea. Similar to pleolipoviruses, nanopleoviruses infect halophilic archaea, but of the phylum Nanohaloarchaeota.

Thalassapleolipoviruses infect archaea of the class Archaeoglobi, which inhabit very high temperature deep-sea geothermal vents. Archaeal viruses that encode homologs of core pleomovirian genes have been identified in methanogens of the order Methanomassiliicoccales and class Methanonatronarchaeia, but they have not been classified or named. Mycoplasmavirus L172, a bacterial circular ssDNA virus, is hypothesized to be related to pleomovirians based on its virion structure and structural proteins, but no genome sequence of it is available to confirm the relation.

== Phylogenetics ==
Pleomovirians are not related to other viruses. Acholeplasma virus L2 (APVL2), of the family Plasmaviridae, has similar virion structure as pleolipoviruses, including being pleomorphic and enveloped. Its genome sequence, however, has no resemblance to pleolipovirus sequences at the nucleotide sequence level. Within the realm, thalassapleoviruses are distantly related to nanopleoviruses and pleolipoviruses. A phylogenetic tree of pleomovirians based on whole genome analysis at the amino acid level is shown hereafter:

- Pleomoviria / Trapavirae
  - - Halobacteria-infecting pleomovirians (pleolipoviruses)
    - Nanohaloarchaeota-infecting pleomovirians (nanopleoviruses)
    - Methanonatronarchaeia-infecting pleomovirians (unclassified)
  - - Archaeoglobi-infecting pleomovirians (thalassapleoviruses)
    - Methanomassiliicoccales-infecting pleomovirians (unclassified)

== History ==
The first pleomovirian to be discovered was the pleolipovirus Halorubrum pleomorphic virus 1 in 2009. With additional discoveries, Pleolipoviridae became the first virus family identified in which its members have either dsDNA or ssDNA genomes, and it was formally accepted as a family in 2016. Pleolipoviruses were then classified into the newly established realm Monodnaviria in 2020 in the kingdom Trapavirae. Thalassapleoviruses were first described in 2024, and accepted as a family a year later. Nanopleoviruses were first described in 2025, and accepted as a family in 2026 in the same order as pleolipoviruses, Haloruvirales. That same year, Monodnaviria was split into four realms corresponding to its four kingdoms after evidence showed that the kingdoms had separate evolutionary origins. With this split, Trapavirae was moved to its own realm, Pleomoviria.

=== Etymology ===
Pleomoviria takes the first part of its name from the word "pleomorphic", referring to the pleomorphic virion shape of viruses in the realm. The second part, -viria, is the suffix used for virus realms. The sole kingdom in the realm, Trapavirae, is named after Trapani, Italy, where Halorubrum pleomorphic virus 1 was discovered. The second part of the kingdom's name is the suffix used for virus kingdoms, -virae.

== See also ==
- List of higher virus taxa
