= Pleomorphism (microbiology) =

Ability of some bacteria to alter their shape or size

In microbiology, pleomorphism (from Ancient Greek πλέω-, pléō, "more", and -μορφή, morphḗ, form), also pleiomorphism, is the ability of some microorganisms to alter their morphology, biological functions or reproductive modes in response to environmental conditions. Pleomorphism has been observed in some members of the Deinococcaceae family of bacteria. The modern definition of pleomorphism in the context of bacteriology is based on variation of morphology or functional methods of the individual cell, rather than a heritable change of these characters as previously believed.

== Bacteria ==
In the first decades of the 20th century, the term "pleomorphism" was used to refer to the idea that bacteria change morphology, biological systems, or reproductive methods dramatically according to environmental cues. This claim was controversial among microbiologists of the time, and split them into two schools: the monomorphists, who opposed the claim, and the pleomorphists such as Antoine Béchamp, Ernst Almquist, Günther Enderlein, Albert Calmette, Gastons Naessens, Royal Raymond Rife, and Lida Mattman, who supported the posit. One historical proponent of pleomorphism was Antoine Béchamp, a 19th-century French biologist who developed what he termed the microzymian theory. Béchamp proposed that microscopic entities he called microzymas were fundamental components of living organisms and that these entities could give rise to different microbial forms under varying conditions. His interpretation of pleomorphism was developed in opposition to the germ theory of disease that became dominant in late 19th-century microbiology. Béchamp's views on pleomorphism are presented in The Blood and Its Third Element, republished in English by A Distant Mirror. The work reproduces Béchamp's original arguments concerning microzymas and their proposed role in biological processes. These ideas are not accepted in modern biology and are regarded as part of the historical development of microbiological thought rather than part of contemporary scientific consensus.

According to a 1997 journal article by Milton Wainwright, a British microbiologist, pleomorphism of bacteria lacked wide acceptance among modern microbiologists of the time.

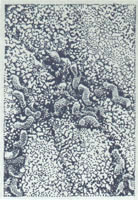
Helicobacter pylori in curved rod form

Monomorphic theory, supported by Louis Pasteur, Rudolf Virchow, Ferdinand Cohn, and Robert Koch, emerged to become the dominant paradigm in modern medical science: it is now almost universally accepted that each bacterial cell is derived from a previously existing cell of practically the same size and shape.

Sergei Winogradsky took a middle-ground stance in the pleomorphism controversy. He agreed with the monomorphic school of thought, but disagreed with some of the foundational microbiological beliefs that the prominent monomorphists Cohn and Koch held. Winogradsky published a literature review titled "The Doctrine of Pleomorphism in Bacteriology" in which he attempted to explicate the pleomorphic debate, identifying the fundamental errors within each side's argument. Winogradsky posited that pleomorphists Naegli and Zopf were unable to perceive the existence of bacterial morphological classes, and that Cohn and Koch, within their own suppositions, ignore species of morphologically variant bacteria that are unable to grow within axenic cultures. Winogradsky explained the perception of pleomorphic bacteria as bacteria progressing through different stages within a developmental cycle, thereby providing the fundamental structure for a theory of morphology based upon the concept of dynamic deviation from a morphological type, or biotype.

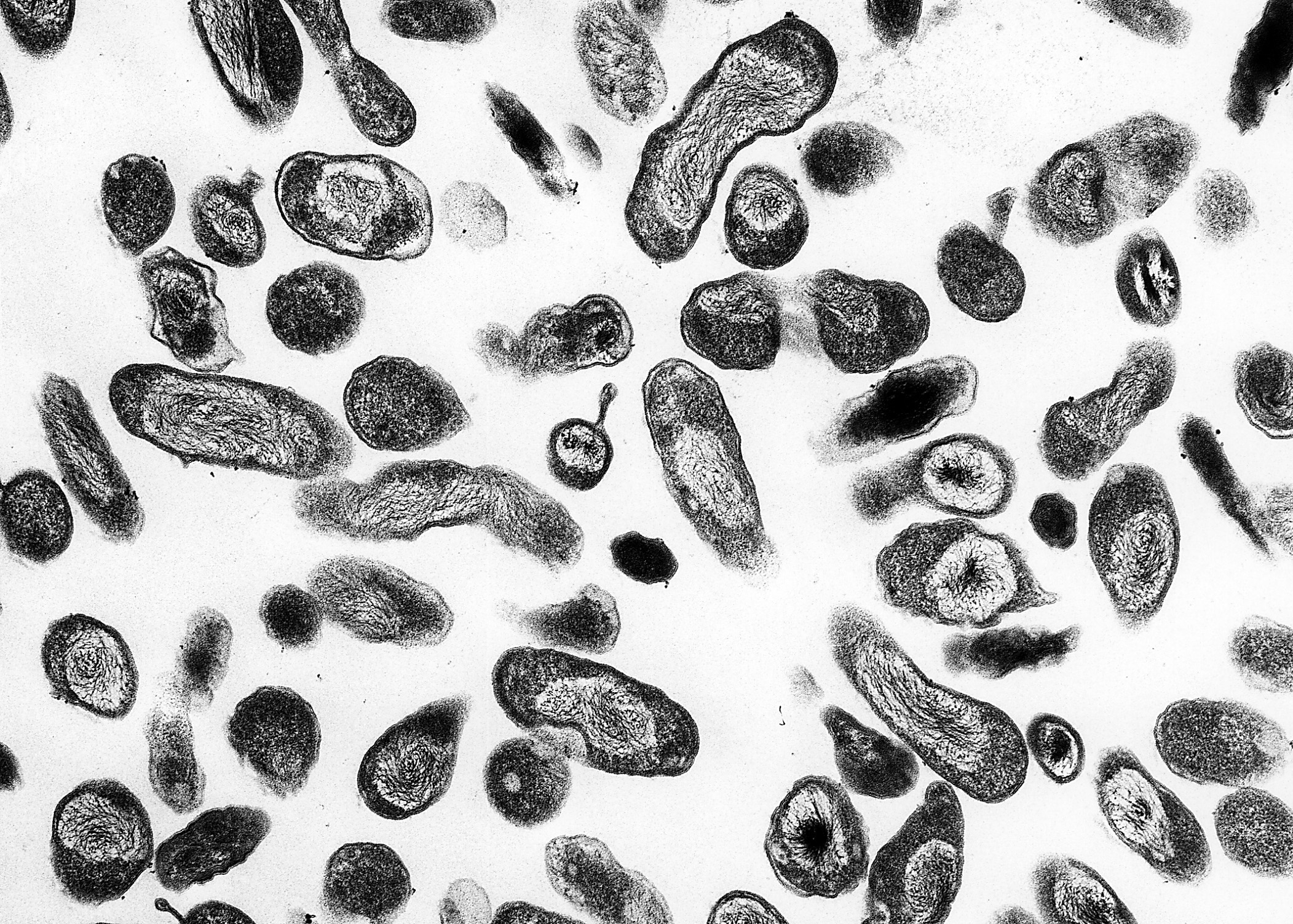
Coxiella burnetii bacteria displaying pleomorphism

While the pleomorphic debate still exists in its original form to some extent, it has predominantly been altered to a discussion regarding the methods, evolutionary inception, and practical applications of pleomorphism. Many modern scientists regard pleomorphism as either a bacterium's response to pressure exerted by environmental factors, such as bacteria that shed antigenic markers in the presence of antibiotics, or as an occurrence in which bacteria evolve successively more complicated forms. A hypothesis referred to as "Pleomorphic Provolution", a component of Stuart Grace's "Ambimorphic Paradigm", takes both of these theories into consideration.

Although it has recently been shown that certain bacteria are capable of dramatically changing shape, pleomorphy remains a controversial concept. A well accepted example of pleomorphism is Helicobacter pylori, which exists as both a helix-shaped form (classified as a curved rod) and a coccoid form. Legionella pneumophila, the species of intracellular bacteria parasite responsible for Legionnaires' disease, has been seen to differentiate within a developmentally diverse network. The genera Corynebacterium and Coccobacillus have been designated as a pleomorphic genera, diphtheroid Bacilli have been classified as pleomorphic nosocomial bacteria. Additionally, in one study focused on agents involved in a non-infectious disease, pleomorphic bacteria were found to exist in the blood of healthy human subjects.

One factor that affects the pleomorphism of some bacteria is their nutrition. For example, the bacterium Deinococcus radiodurans has been shown to exhibit pleomorphism in relation to differences in the nutrient contents of its environment.

== Viruses ==
The virions of certain viruses sometimes exhibit pleomorphism, in the sense that their appearances can vary. However, this is not true pleomorphism, as individual virions are not changing shape, but being succeeded by virions with different shapes. One example is the bacterial viruses of the Plasmaviridae family. A group of haloarchaeal viruses has been shown to exhibit pleomorphism as well.
