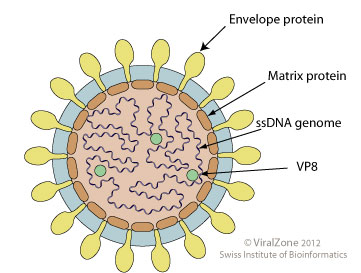
- Alphapleolipovirus virion (cross section)

Virus classification
- (unranked): Virus
- Realm: Monodnaviria
- Kingdom: Trapavirae
- Phylum: Saleviricota
- Class: Huolimaviricetes
- Order: Haloruvirales
- Family: Pleolipoviridae
- Genus: Alphapleolipovirus
- Species: Alphapleolipovirus finnoniense

= Halorubrum pleomorphic virus 1 =

Species of virus

Halorubrum pleomorphic virus 1 (HRPV-1) is a single stranded DNA virus that infects the species of the archaeal genus Halorubrum. It is unlike any other known virus infecting the archaea with a single stranded DNA genome and an external lipid envelope and is classified in the family Pleolipoviridae, genus Alphapleolipovirus, species Alphapleolipovirus finnoniense.

== Virology ==
The virons are pleomorphic is shape with an external lipid envelope. There are two main structural proteins (VP3 and VP4) of molecular weights 15 and 53 kilodaltons respectively. The genome does not appear to be associated with a nucleoprotein.

The spike protein (VP4) is glycosylated. The lipid envelope is similar to its host's composition. VP3 is a membrane protein that does not appears to be exposed to the external environment. It may be organised to form a shell around the genome as is the case in other viruses but this is not yet known.

This virus infects members of the genus Halorubrum. Infection appears to be productive without lysis of the host like may of the archaeal viruses. Exit is likely to be by budding from the cell membrane.

== Genome ==
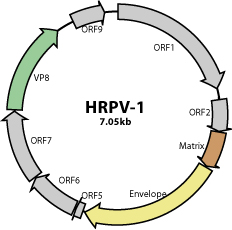
HRPV-1 genome map

The genome is a single stranded DNA molecule 7048 bases in length. It encodes nine open reading frames. Two of these encode the structural proteins VP3 and VP4. Another (VP8) seems likely to be an ATPase. The functions of the remaining proteins is not known.
