= Yingchengvirus =

Virus classification
- (unranked): Virus
- Realm: Singelaviria
- Kingdom: Helvetiavirae
- Phylum: Dividoviricota
- Class: Laserviricetes
- Order: Halopanivirales
- Family: Simuloviridae
- Genus: Yingchengvirus

Genus of viruses

Yingchengvirus is a genus of double stranded DNA viruses that infect haloarchaea. The genus was previously named Betasphaerolipovirus.

== Taxonomy ==
The genus contains the following species:

- Yingchengvirus koreaense (formerly Yingchengvirus HJIV1)
- Yingchengvirus boliviaense (formerly Yingchengvirus NVIV1)
- Yingchengvirus sinense (formerly Natrinema virus SNJ1 (2014-2019, type species), Yingchengvirus SNJ1 (2020))

== Morphology ==
Viruses of this genus have tailless icosahedral virions with an internal lipid membrane located between the protein capsid and the circular double stranded DNA genome.

== Replication ==
The temperate haloarchaeal virus SNJ1 displays lytic and lysogenic life cycles. During the lysogenic cycle, the virus resides in its host in the form of an extrachromosomal circular plasmid. Upon mitomycin C induction, large amounts of SNJ1 virions can be produced. SNJ1 genome replicates by the rolling-circle mechanism and is initiated by the virus-encoded RepA protein, which is homologous to the replication-initiation proteins of archaeal plasmids and bacterial transposases of the IS91 family insertion sequences. The virus is released by lysis of the infected cells.
