= Haloruvirales =

Virus classification
- (unranked): Virus
- Realm: Pleomoviria
- Kingdom: Trapavirae
- Phylum: Saleviricota
- Class: Huolimaviricetes
- Order: Haloruvirales

Order of viruses

Haloruvirales is an order of viruses. The order has two families.

== Classification ==
The order contains the following families:

- Nanopleoviridae
- Pleolipoviridae
