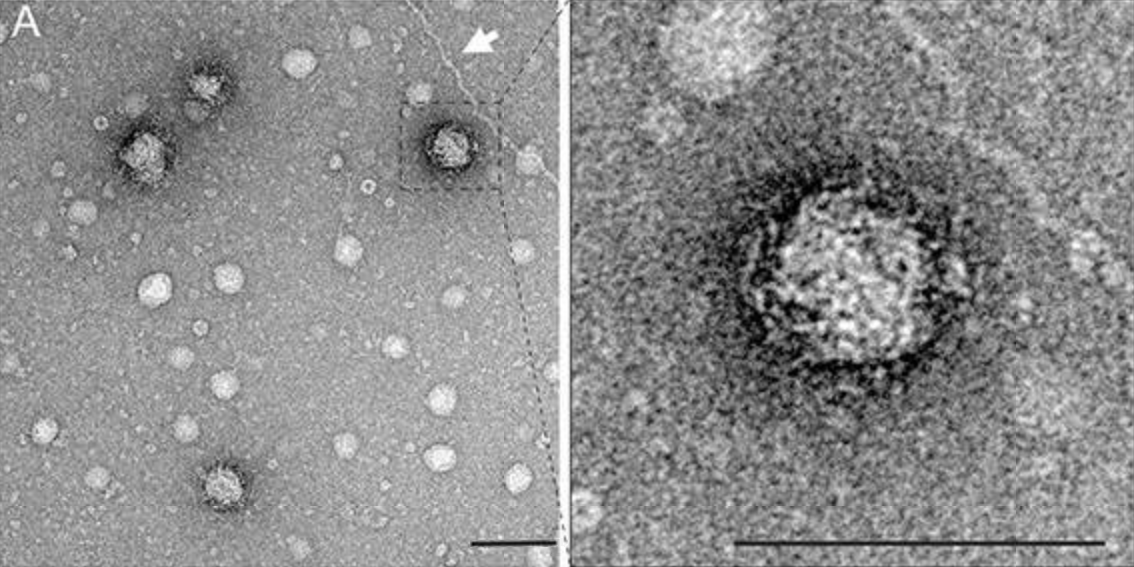
- Archaeoglobus veneficus pleomorphic virus 1 (AvPV1), Avenivirus atlanticense

Virus classification
- (unranked): Virus
- Realm: Pleomoviria
- Kingdom: Trapavirae
- Phylum: Calorviricota
- Class: Caminiviricetes
- Order: Ageovirales
- Family: Thalassapleoviridae

Genera
- See text

= Thalassapleoviridae =

Family of viruses

Thalassapleoviridae is a family of viruses.

== Taxonomy ==
Thalassapleoviridae contains the following genera:

- Aprofuvirus
- Avenivirus
- Geogavirus
