= Halopanivirales =

Virus classification
- (unranked): Virus
- Realm: Singelaviria
- Kingdom: Helvetiavirae
- Phylum: Dividoviricota
- Class: Laserviricetes
- Order: Halopanivirales

Order of viruses

Halopanivirales is an order of viruses. The order has three families:

- Matsushitaviridae
- Simuloviridae
- Sphaerolipoviridae
