= Yaravirus =

Virus classification
- (unranked): Virus
- Realm: Varidnaviria
- Kingdom: Bamfordvirae
- Phylum: Nucleocytoviricota
- Class: Mriyaviricetes
- Family: Yaraviridae
- Genus: Yaravirus

Species
- Yaravirus brasiliense

Amoebic virus

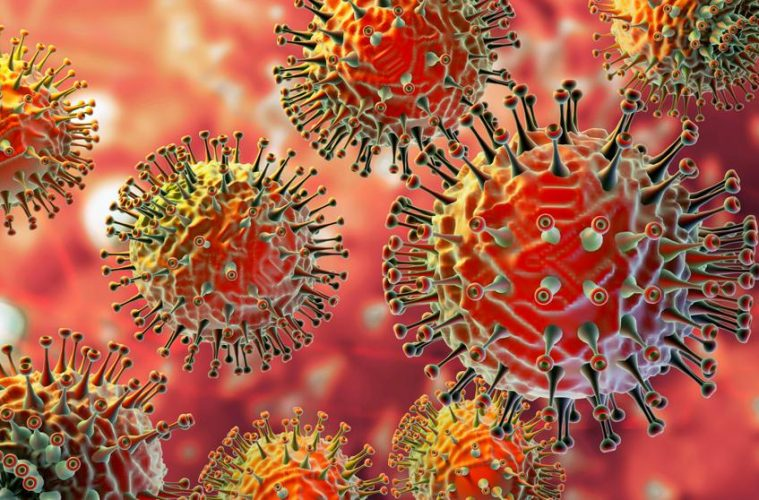
Yaravirus aussehen

Yaravirus is an amoebic virus (a virus that reproduces in amoeba) that is a sole representative of its own class, Mriyaviricetes (from mriya (мрія), a Ukrainian word for "dream" or "inspiration" + -viricetes). It was discovered in the waters of Lake Pampulha in Minas Gerais, Brazil, in 2020. The virus was found to be significantly smaller than any known amoebic virus, and is notable in that 90% of its genome appears to have no homology to previously sequenced amino acids in other organisms. The organism was named after the Brazilian mythological figure, Iara.

One author described the virus as one that "simply makes no sense", and as "an extreme example", noting that "of Yaravirus' 74 genes, 68 are unlike any ever found in any virus". With respect to efforts by scientists to develop a megataxonomy of viruses, Yaravirus was described as "lonely and unclassifiable". Another analysis describes the virus as "either highly reduced and divergent NCLDVs or, more probably, the first non-NCLDV isolated from Acanthamoeba species", also noting "an ATPase most similar to the mimivirus homologue" and a major capsid protein phylogeny that is "not compatible with that of the ATPase phylogeny", suggesting that the virus originated through a horizontal gene transfer.
