= Atsuirnavirus =

Atsuirnavirus caloris

Virus classification
- (unranked): Virus
- Realm: Riboviria
- Kingdom: Orthornavirae
- Phylum: Artimaviricota
- Class: Furtirnaviricetes
- Order: Divaquavirales
- Family: Hakuzoviridae
- Genus: Atsuirnavirus
- Species: Atsuirnavirus caloris

Genus of viruses

Atsuirnavirus is a genus of viruses which infect thermoacidophilic bacteria, containing the single species Atsuirnavirus caloris.
