= Singelaviria =

Virus classification
- (unranked): Virus
- Realm: Singelaviria
- Kingdom: Helvetiavirae
- Phylum: Dividoviricota
- Class: Laserviricetes

Subtaxa
- See text

Realm of viruses

Singelaviria is a realm of viruses that includes all viruses that encode major capsid proteins (MCPs) that contain a single vertical jelly roll fold. Singelavirians have one or two MCPs that have the single jelly roll (SJR) fold, numerous copies of which form the sides of the icosahedral capsid, a protein shell that protects the viral genome. The jelly roll fold is perpendicular (vertical) to the capsid surface. Apart from the MCP, singelavirians also encode a minor capsid protein with a vertical SJR fold, which assembles to form the pentagonal vertices of the capsid, and an ATPase that packages viral DNA into the capsid. Characterized singelavirians have a lipid membrane inside the capsid surrounding the genome and spikes protruding from the capsid's vertices.

Viruses in Singelaviria infect archaea that inhabit highly saline environments (halophiles) and bacteria that inhabit high-temperature environments (thermophiles). Their DNA genome is double-stranded and either linear or circular in form. Replication methods used by singelavirians include rolling circle replication and probably protein-primed replication. Some viruses in the realm are capable of replication both by the lytic cycle, which releases virions from the cell by rupturing of the cell membrane (lysis), and the lysogenic cycle, during which the virus remains dormant in the host cell without producing virions.

The MCP and mCP are believed to be inherited from cellular ancestors. Within the realm, singelavirians that encode two SJR MCPs are believed to be descended from those that encode just one and to be the result of a gene duplication event. From 2019 to 2024, viruses in Singelaviria were classified in the kingdom Helvetiavirae in the realm Varidnaviria, which contains DNA viruses that encode MCPs that have two vertical jelly roll folds. It was originally believed that such viruses were descended from singelavirians, but further research showed that the two groups of viruses have separate evolutionary origins, so in 2025 Helvetiavirae was given its own realm, Singelaviria.

== Classification ==
Singelaviria is monotypic down to the rank of its sole class, Laserviricetes, which has three orders. This is shown hereafter:

- Realm: Singelaviria
  - Kingdom: Helvetiavirae
    - Phylum: Dividoviricota
      - Class: Laserviricetes
        - Order: Ducavirales, which contains nanicoviruses
        - Order: Halopanivirales, which contains matsushitaviruses, simuloviruses, and sphaerolipoviruses
        - Order: Salinicovirales, which contains halicoviruses

== Characteristics ==
=== Genome ===
Classified singelavirians have circular double-stranded DNA (dsDNA) genomes, except for sphaerolipoviruses, which have linear dsDNA genomes. Viruses in Halopanivirales have genomes ranging from 16 to 31 kilobase pairs (kbp) in length: sphaerolipovirus genomes are 28–31 kbp long, simulovirus genomes 16–19 kbp, and matsushitavirus virus genomes 17–19.6 kbp. Halicoviruses have genomes about 13.6 kbp in length, and nanicovirus genomes are 13.6–18 kbp long.

=== Structure ===
Singelavirians have an icosahedral protein shell called a capsid. Inside the capsid is a lipid membrane that surrounds the virus's genome. Based on analysis of sphaerolipoviruses, the lipid membrane is obtained from host cell membranes and contains virus-specific proteins embedded in it. Sphaerolipoviruses have two scaffold proteins that guide the position of capsid subunits, called capsomeres, and they have spikes at the vertices of the capsid that attach to the surface of cells. These spikes are made of multiple proteins and are shaped like horns or propellers.

=== Proteins ===
The capsid is made primarily of one or two major capsid proteins that contain a single vertical jelly roll fold. (Note: Halicoviruses encode one SJR MCP, while other classified singelavirians encode two SJR MCPs.) The major capsid proteins are named so because they are the primary proteins that the capsid is made of. A jelly roll fold is a type of folded structure in a protein in which eight antiparallel beta strands are organized into four antiparallel beta sheets in a layout resembling a jelly roll, also called a Swiss roll. Each beta strand is a specific sequence of amino acids, and these strands bond to their antiparallel strands via hydrogen bonds. The SJR folds are vertical, or perpendicular, to the capsid surface, in contrast to horizontal folds that are parallel to the capsid surface. During the process of assembling the viral capsid, MCPs self-assemble into hexagonal structures called hexons. Hexons then bond to form the relatively flat triangular sides of the icosahedral capsid.

In addition to the shared MCP, all singelavirians encode a minor capsid protein (mCP) that contains an SJR fold. These mCPs assemble into pentagonal structures, pentons, that form the pentagonal vertices of the capsid. Singelavirians also encode a genome packaging ATPase of the FtsK-HerA superfamily. The ATPases in Singelaviria are enzymes that package the viral DNA into the capsid during the process of assembling virions. FtsK-HerA is a family of proteins that contains a transmembrane domain with four membrane-spanning helices at the start of the protein's amino acid sequence, a central coiled-coil region, and an ATPase with a P-loop fold at the end of the protein's amino acid sequence. FtsK proteins are found in nearly all bacteria and HerA proteins in all archaea and some bacteria. Singelavirians also commonly encode integrase, such as halicoviruses and nanicoviruses.

=== Life cycle ===
Sphaerolipoviruses are lytic viruses, i.e. infection leads directly to lysis and death of the host cell. Matsushitaviruses and simuloviruses, on the other hand, are temperate viruses capable of both lytic and lysogenic cycles. During the lysogenic cycle, simuloviruses reside as proviruses in the host cell as extra-chromosomal episomes. Furthermore, they encode a protein that controls whether they go into a lytic or lysogenic cycle. Singelavirians use various methods to replicate their genomes, including rolling circle replication for simuloviruses, and probably protein-primed replication for sphaerolipoviruses.

== Distribution ==
Singelavirians infect prokaryotes. Matsushitaviruses are the only classified singelavirians to infect bacteria; all others infect archaea that reside in highly saline environments (halophiles). More specifically, matsushitaviruses infect bacteria that live in high temperature environments (thermophiles), namely Thermus thermophilus. Halicoviruses infect haloarchaea, nanicoviruses infect nanohaloarchaea, simuloviruses infect archaea of the genera Haloterrigena and Natrinema, and sphaerolipoviruses infect archaea of the genera Haloarcula and Halorubrum.

== Phylogenetics ==
The ancestor of the singelavirian SJR MCP is unknown but is hypothesized to be a cellular SJR-containing protein. Within the realm, an apparent gene duplication event occurred for the MCP, producing two SJR MCPs for certain lineages. The minor capsid protein (mCP) is believed to have evolved from cellular pentameric SJR proteins. Singelavirians, like viruses of the realm Varidnaviria, encode an ATPase of the FtsK-HerA superfamily. It is thought, however, that the need for ATP hydrolysis evolved independently in these two groups of viruses and that they incidentally recruited ATPases from the same lineage.

== History ==
The first singelavirian to be discovered was bacteriophage IN93, a matsuhitavirus discovered in 1995. The first sphaerolipovirus was discovered in 2003: Haloarcula Hispanic virus SH1. That same year, Natrinema virus SNJ1 was the first simulovirus discovered, but it was first mistaken to be a plasmid since it was discovered in its episomal, proviral form, which resembles plasmids. From 2019 to 2024, singelavirians were classified in the kingdom Helvetiavirae in the realm Varidnaviria, which was created to accommodate all viruses with vertical jelly roll fold MCPs. After it was discovered that single and double vertical jelly roll fold MCP-encoding viruses had different evolutionary origins, the vertical SJR MCP lineage (Helvetiavirae) was given its own realm, Singelaviria, in 2025. Halicoviruses and nanicoviruses were first described in the same year and added to the realm in 2026.

=== Etymology ===
Singelaviria is a portmanteau of sing, from Latin singulus, which means "single", Latin gelata, which means "jelly", a reference to the jelly roll fold, and -viria, the suffix used for virus realms. The sole kingdom in the realm, Helvetiavirae, is derived from Latin helvetia, which means "Swiss", a reference to Swiss jelly rolls, and -virae, the suffix used for virus kingdoms. The realm's sole phylum, Dividoviricota, is from Esperanto divido, which means "division", a reference to the two single jelly roll major capsid proteins, and -viricota, the suffix used for virus phyla. Lastly, the only class in the realm, Laserviricetes, is a portmanteau of Serpentine Lake on Rottnest Island in Australia, where the first sphaerolipovirus, SH1, was discovered, and -viricetes, the suffix used for virus classes.

== See also ==
- List of higher virus taxa
