= Alphaabyssovirus =

Virus classification
- (unranked): Virus
- Realm: Riboviria
- Kingdom: Orthornavirae
- Phylum: Pisuviricota
- Class: Pisoniviricetes
- Order: Nidovirales
- Suborder: Abnidovirineae
- Family: Abyssoviridae
- Subfamily: Tiamatvirinae
- Genus: Alphaabyssovirus

Subgenus and species
- Aplyccavirus; Alphaabyssovirus aplysiae

Genus of viruses

Alphaabyssovirus is a genus of positive-strand RNA viruses in the order Nidovirales which infect sea hares. The genus is monotypic. It contains only the subgenus Aplyccavirus, which contains only one species, Alphaabyssovirus aplysiae. Alphaabyssovirus is also the only member of the subfamily Tiamatvirinae, which in turn is the only member of family Abyssoviridae, which likewise is the only member of the Abnidovirineae suborder. Alphaabyssovirus aplysiae was first isolated from a sample from a California sea hare (Aplysia californica).
