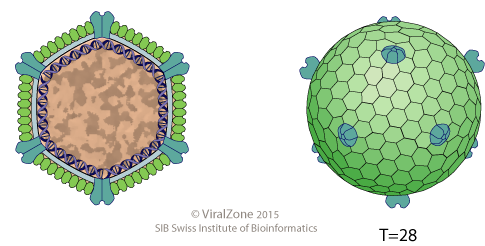
- Sphaerolipoviridae virion

Virus classification
- (unranked): Virus
- Realm: Singelaviria
- Kingdom: Helvetiavirae
- Phylum: Dividoviricota
- Class: Laserviricetes
- Order: Halopanivirales
- Family: Sphaerolipoviridae
- Genus: Alphasphaerolipovirus

Species
- Alphasphaerolipovirus helsinkii; Alphasphaerolipovirus pinkense; Alphasphaerolipovirus serpentinense; Alphasphaerolipovirus viikkii

= Alphasphaerolipovirus =

Genus of viruses

Alphasphaerolipovirus is a genus of double stranded DNA viruses that infect Haloarchaea. The genus contains four species.

== Taxonomy ==
The genus contains the following species:

- Alphasphaerolipovirus helsinkii (formerly Haloarcula hispanica icosahedral virus 2 (2014-2019), A. HHIV2 (2021))
- Alphasphaerolipovirus pinkense (formerly Haloarcula hispanica virus PH1 (2014-2019), A. PH1 (2021))
- Alphasphaerolipovirus serpentinense (formerly Haloarcula hispanica virus SH1 (2014-2019), A. SH1 (2021))
- Alphasphaerolipovirus viikkii (formerly Haloarcula virus HCIV1 (2014-2019), A. HCIV1 (2021))

== Note ==
The name Halosphaerovirus was also proposed for this genus.
