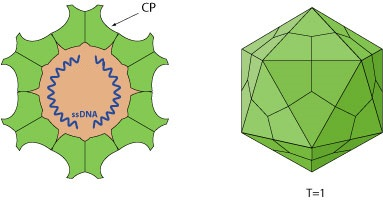

Virus classification
- (unranked): Virus
- Realm: Floreoviria
- Kingdom: Shotokuvirae
- Phylum: Cossaviricota
- Class: Mouviricetes
- Order: Polivirales
- Family: Bidnaviridae
- Genus: Bidensovirus

Species
- Bidensovirus bombymori

= Bidensovirus =

Genus of viruses

Bidensovirus is a genus of single stranded DNA viruses that infect invertebrates. The species in this genus was originally classified in the family Parvoviridae (subfamily Densovirinae) but was moved to a new genus because of significant differences in the genomes.

== Taxonomy ==
There is one species in this genus: Bidensovirus bombymori, commonly called Bombyx mori bidensovirus.

== Host ==
As the name suggests this virus infects Bombyx mori, the silkworm.

== Virology ==
The virions are icosahedral, non enveloped and ~25 nanometers in diameter. They contain two structural proteins.

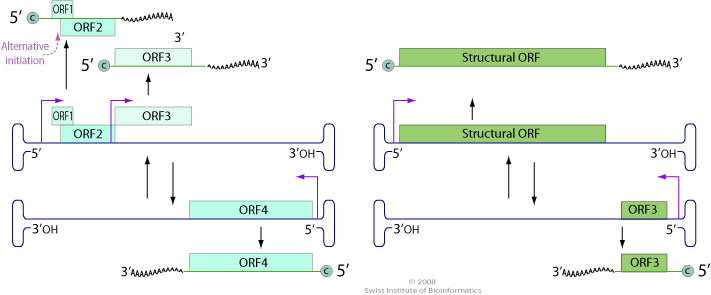
Genome map of genus Bidensovirus

The genome is bipartite, unique among ssDNA viruses, with two linear segments of ~6 and 6.5 kilobases (kb). These segments and the complementary strands are that are packaged separately giving rise to 4 different types of full particles.

Both segments have an ambisense organization, coding for a structural protein in one sense and the non-structural proteins on the complementary strand.

- DNA1 (also known as VD1) — the larger segment of 6.5 kb — encodes the capsid protein VP1 (128 kDa — kilodaltons) on one strand and three non-structural proteins — NS1 of 14 kDa, NS2 of 37 kDa and NS3 of 55 kDa — on the complementary strand.
- DNA2 (also known as VD2) — the smaller segment of 6 kb — encodes the capsid protein VP2 (133 kDa) on one strand and the non-structural protein NS4 (27 kDa) on the complementary strand.

The open reading frame 4 (VD1-ORF4) is 3318 nucleotides (bases) in length and encodes a predicted (3318/3 − 1 =) 1105 amino acid protein which has a conserved DNA polymerase motif. It appears to encode at least 2 other proteins including one of ~53 kDa that forms part of the virion.

== Evolution ==
Comprehensive analysis of bidnavirus genes has shown that these viruses have evolved from a parvovirus ancestor from which they inherit a jelly-roll capsid protein and a superfamily 3 helicase. It has been further suggested that the key event that led to the separation of the bidnaviruses from parvoviruses was the acquisition of the PolB gene. A likely scenario has been proposed under which the ancestral parvovirus genome was integrated into a large virus-derived DNA transposon of the Polinton/Maverick family (polintoviruses) resulting in the acquisition of the polintovirus PolB gene along with terminal inverted repeats. Bidnavirus genes for a minor structural protein (putative receptor-binding protein) and a potential novel antiviral defense modulator were derived from dsRNA viruses (Reoviridae) and dsDNA viruses (Baculoviridae), respectively.
