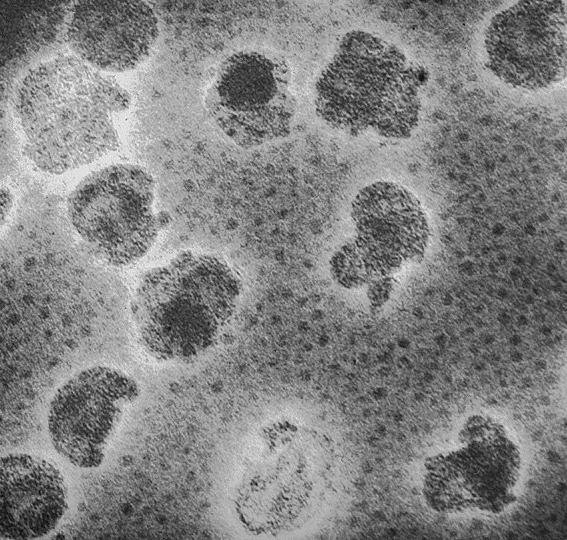
- EM of a plasmavirus

Virus classification
- (unranked): Virus
- Family: Plasmaviridae
- Genus: Plasmavirus

Species
- Plasmavirus L2

Synonyms
- Plasmavirus: Plasmavirus ICTV 1981; Mycoplasma virus type 2 phages ICTV 1978; Plasmavirus L2: Plasmavirus L2 ICTV 2021; Acholeplasma virus L2 ICTV 2015; Acholeplasma phage L2 ICTV 1991; Phage MV-L2 ICTV 1978

= Plasmaviridae =

Plasmavirus

Family of viruses

Plasmaviridae is a family of bacteria-infecting viruses. Acholeplasma species serve as natural hosts. There is one genus in the family, Plasmavirus, which contains one species: Acholeplasma phage L2 (Plasmavirus L2). All viruses known in this family have been isolated from species in the class Mollicutes.

This family is poorly studied and little is known about the diversity and biology of these viruses.

== Taxonomy ==
The family has one genus, Plasmavirus, which has one recognized member: Acholeplasma phage L2 (Plasmavirus L2).

There are five tentative members of Plasmavirus:

- Mycoplasmatales virus-laidlawii 1 (L1)
- Mycoplasmatales virus-laidlawii 2 (L2)
- Mycoplasmatales virus-laidlawii 3 (L3)
- Mycoplasmatales virus-laidlawii 51 (L51)
- Mycoplasmatales virus-laidlawii O1 (O1)

== Genome ==
The genome is condensed, nonsegmented and consists of a single molecule of circular, supercoiled double-stranded DNA, 12 kilobase pairs in length. The genome has a rather high G-C content of ~32%. The genome has 14 open reading frames, and encodes at least 15 proteins, of which at least two are structural proteins embedded in the envelope.

== Structure ==
Virions are quasi-spherical, slightly pleomorphic, enveloped and about 80 nm (range 50–125 nm) in diameter.

Genus	Structure	Symmetry	Capsid	Genomic arrangement	Genomic segmentation
Plasmavirus	Spherical to pleomorphic	Undefined	Enveloped	Circular	Monopartite

== Life cycle ==
Viral replication is cytoplasmic. DNA-templated transcription is the method of transcription. The virus exits the host cell by budding. Acholeplasma species serve as the natural host.

Genus	Host details	Tissue tropism	Entry details	Release details	Replication site	Assembly site	Transmission
Plasmavirus	Bacteria: Acholeplasma sp.	None	Fusion	Membrane budding	Cytoplasm	Unknown	Unknown

== Infection ==
A productive infectious cycle begins before a lysogenic cycle establishes the virus in the infected bacteria. After initial infection of the viral genome the virus may become latent within the host. Lysogeny involves integration into the host chromosome.
