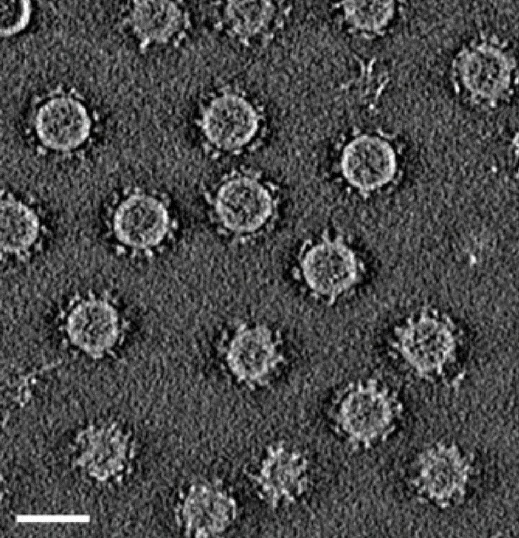
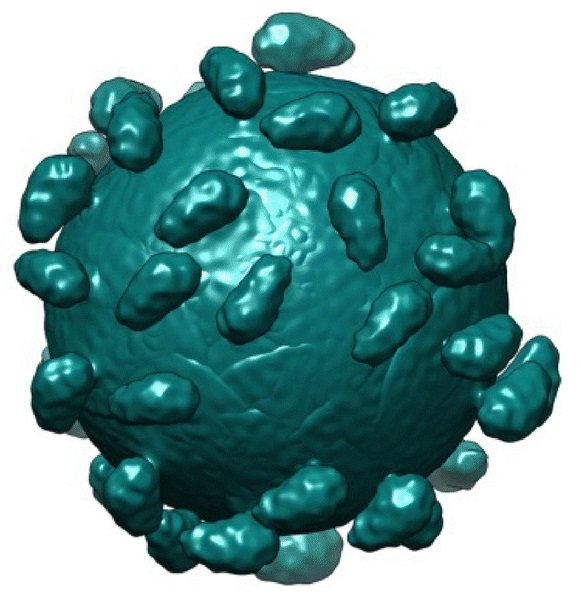
- Cryo-electron tomography (left) and structure (right) of Halorubrum pleomorphic virus 6 (HRPV-6), Alphapleolipovirus samutsakhonense

Virus classification
- (unranked): Virus
- Realm: Pleomoviria
- Kingdom: Trapavirae
- Phylum: Saleviricota
- Class: Huolimaviricetes
- Order: Haloruvirales
- Family: Pleolipoviridae

Genera
- See text

= Pleolipoviridae =

Family of viruses

Pleolipoviridae is a family of DNA viruses that infect halophilic archaea..

Viruses belonging to the family Pleolipoviridae are characterised by pleomorphic virus particles, which consist of a lipid membrane with spike protein(s) and membrane protein(s), but have no capsid shell. The genome is a single-stranded or double-stranded, linear or circular DNA molecule, depending on a species.

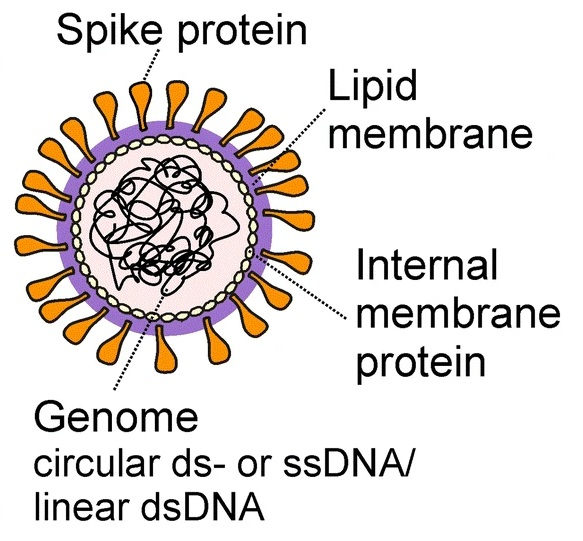
Schematic overview of a pleolipoviral virion

== Taxonomy ==
The following genera are recognized:

- Alphapleolipovirus
- Betapleolipovirus
- Gammapleolipovirus

Also, Epsilonpleolipovirus was proposed based on analyses of metagenomic data, but not ratified yet.
