= Veterinary virology =

Study of viruses affecting animals

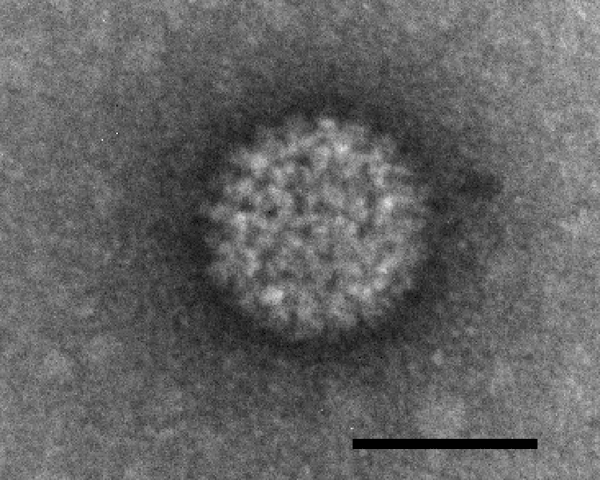
Bluetongue virus

Veterinary virology is the study of viruses in non-human animals. It is an important branch of veterinary medicine.

== Rhabdoviruses ==
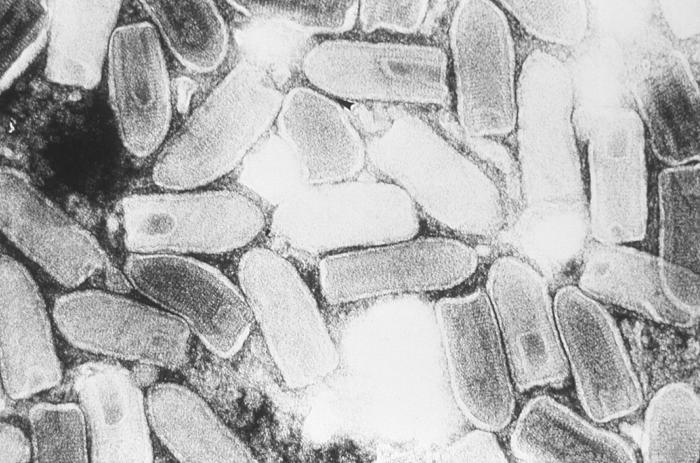
Vesicular stomatitis virus (VSV), the prototypical rhabdovirus

Rhabdoviruses are a diverse family of single stranded, negative sense RNA viruses that infect a wide range of hosts, from plants and insects, to fish and mammals. The Rhaboviridae family consists of six genera, two of which, cytorhabdoviruses and nucleorhabdoviruses, only infect plants. Novirhabdoviruses infect fish, and vesiculovirus, lyssavirus and ephemerovirus infect mammals, fish and invertebrates. The family includes pathogens such as rabies virus, vesicular stomatitis virus and potato yellow dwarf virus that are of public health, veterinary, and agricultural significance.

== Foot-and-mouth disease virus ==
Foot-and-mouth disease virus (FMDV) is a member of the Aphthovirus genus in the Picornaviridae family and is the cause of foot-and-mouth disease in pigs, cattle, sheep and goats. It is a non-enveloped, positive strand, RNA virus. FMDV is a highly contagious virus. It enters the body through inhalation.

== Pestiviruses ==
Pestiviruses have a single stranded, positive-sense RNA genomes. They cause Classical swine fever (CSF) and Bovine viral diarrhea(BVD). Mucosal disease is a distinct, chronic persistent infection, whereas BVD is an acute infection.

== Arteriviruses ==
Arteriviruses are small, enveloped, animal viruses with an icosahedral core containing a positive-sense RNA genome. The family includes equine arteritis virus (EAV), porcine reproductive and respiratory syndrome virus (PRRSV), lactate dehydrogenase elevating virus (LDV) of mice and simian haemorrhagic fever virus (SHFV).

== Coronaviruses ==
Coronaviruses are enveloped viruses with a positive-sense RNA genome and with a nucleocapsid of helical symmetry. They infect the upper respiratory and gastrointestinal tract of mammals and birds. They are the cause of a wide range of diseases in cats, dog, pigs, rodents, cattle and humans. Transmission is by the faecal-oral route.

== Toroviruses ==
Torovirus is a genus of viruses within the family Coronaviridae, subfamily Torovirinae that primarily infect vertebrates and include Berne virus of horses and Breda virus of cattle. They cause gastroenteritis in mammals, including humans but rarely.

== Influenza ==
Influenza is caused by RNA viruses of the family Orthomyxoviridae and affects birds and mammals.

=== Avian influenza ===
Wild aquatic birds are the natural hosts for a large variety of influenza A viruses. Occasionally viruses are transmitted from this reservoir to other species and may then cause devastating outbreaks in domestic poultry or give rise to human influenza pandemics.

== Bluetongue virus ==
Bluetongue virus (BTV), a member of Orbivirus genus within the Reoviridae family causes serious disease in livestock (sheep, goat, cattle). It is non-enveloped, double-stranded RNA virus. The genome is segmented.

== Circoviruses ==
Circoviruses are small single-stranded DNA viruses. There are two genera: gyrovirus, with one species called chicken anemia virus; and circovirus, which includes porcine circovirus types 1 and 2, psittacine beak and feather disease virus, pigeon circovirus, canary circovirus, goose circovirus.

== Herpesviruses ==
Herpesviruses are ubiquitous pathogens infecting a variety of animals, including humans. Hosts include many economically important species such as abalone, oysters, salmon, poultry (avian infectious laryngotracheitis, Marek's disease), cattle (bovine malignant catarrhal fever), dogs, goats, horses, cats (feline viral rhinotracheitis), and pigs (pseudorabies). Infections may be severe and may result in fatalities or reduced productivity. Therefore, outbreaks of herpesviruses in livestock cause significant financial losses and are an important area of study in veterinary virology.

== African swine fever virus ==
African swine fever virus (ASFV) is a large double-stranded DNA virus which replicates in the cytoplasm of infected cells and is the only member of the Asfarviridae family. The virus causes a lethal haemorraghic disease in domestic pigs. Some strains can cause death of animals within as little as a week after infection. In other species, the virus causes no obvious disease. ASFV is endemic to sub-Saharan Africa and exists in the wild through a cycle of infection between ticks and wild pigs, bushpigs and warthogs.

== Retroviruses ==
Retroviruses are established pathogens of veterinary importance. They are generally a cause of cancer or immune deficiency.

== Flaviviruses ==
Flaviviruses constitute a family of linear, single-stranded RNA(+) viruses. Flaviviruses include the West Nile virus, dengue virus, Tick-borne Encephalitis Virus, Yellow Fever Virus, and several other viruses. Many flavivirus species can replicate in both mammalian and insect cells. Most flaviviruses are arthropod borne and multiply in both vertebrates and arthropods. The viruses in this family that are of veterinary importance include Japanese encephalitis virus, St. Louis encephalitis virus, West Nile virus, Israel turkey meningoencephalomyelitis virus, Sitiawan virus, Wesselsbron virus, yellow fever virus and the tick-borne flaviviruses e.g. louping ill virus.

== Paramyxoviruses ==
Paramyxoviruses are a diverse family of non-segmented negative strand RNA viruses that include many highly pathogenic viruses affecting humans, animals, and birds. These include canine distemper virus (dogs), phocine distemper virus (seals), cetacean morbillivirus (dolphins and porpoises) Newcastle disease virus (birds) and rinderpest virus (cattle). Some paramyxoviruses such as the henipaviruses are zoonotic pathogens, occurring primarily in an animal hosts, but also able to infect humans.

== Parvovirus ==
Parvoviruses are linear, non-segmented single-stranded DNA viruses, with an average genome size of 5000 nucleotides. They are classified as group II viruses in Baltimore classification of viruses. Parvoviruses are among the smallest viruses (hence the name, from Latin parvus meaning small) and are 18–28 nm in diameter.

Parvoviruses can cause disease in some animals, including starfish and humans. Because the viruses require actively dividing cells to replicate, the type of tissue infected varies with the age of the animal. The gastrointestinal tract and lymphatic system can be affected at any age, leading to vomiting, diarrhea and immunosuppression but cerebellar hypoplasia is only seen in cats that were infected in the womb or at less than two weeks of age, and disease of the myocardium is seen in puppies infected between the ages of three and eight weeks.

== See also ==
- Bat virome
- History of virology
- Social history of viruses
- Virus evolution
