= Equine viral arteritis =

Equine arteritis virus

Virus classification
- (unranked): Virus
- Realm: Riboviria
- Kingdom: Orthornavirae
- Phylum: Pisuviricota
- Class: Pisoniviricetes
- Order: Nidovirales
- Family: Arteriviridae
- Subfamily: Equarterivirinae
- Genus: Alphaarterivirus
- Species: Alphaarterivirus equid

Species of virus

Equine viral arteritis (EVA) is a disease of horses caused by a virus of the species Equine arteritis virus (Alphaarterivirus equid), an RNA virus. It is the only species in the genus Alphaarterivirus, and that is the only genus in the Equarterivirinae subfamily. The virus which causes EVA was first isolated in 1953, but the disease has afflicted equine animals worldwide for centuries. It has been more common in some breeds of horses in the United States, but there is no breed "immunity". In the UK, it is a notifiable disease. There is no known human hazard.

== Signs ==
The signs shown depend on the horse's age, the strain of the infecting virus, the condition of the horse and the route by which it was infected. Most horses with EVA infection do not show any signs; if a horse does show signs, these can vary greatly in severity. Following infection, the first sign is fever, peaking at 41 °C (106 °F), followed by various signs such as lethargy, nasal discharge, "pink eye" (conjunctivitis), swelling over the eye (supraorbital edema), urticaria, and swelling of the limbs and under the belly (the ventral abdomen) which may extend to the udder in mares or the scrotum of male horses. More unusual signs include spontaneous abortion in pregnant mares, and, most likely in foals, severe respiratory distress and death.

== Cause ==
EVA is caused by an arterivirus called equine arteritis virus (EAV). Arteriviruses are small, enveloped, animal viruses with an icosahedral core containing a positive-sense RNA genome. As well as equine arteritis virus the Arterivirus family includes porcine reproductive and respiratory syndrome virus (PRRSV), lactate dehydrogenase elevating virus (LDV) of mice and simian haemorrhagic fever virus (SHFV).

There are a number of routes of transmission of the virus. The most frequent is the respiratory route. Virions can also be shed into the semen, and the disease has been spread by artificial insemination. Stallions may become carriers.

== Diagnosis ==
Because of the variability of symptoms, diagnosis is by laboratory testing. Blood samples, nasal swabs and semen can be used for isolation of the virus, detection of the viral RNA by reverse transcriptase polymerase chain reaction and detection of antibodies by ELISA tests.

== Prevention ==
A vaccine is available in the UK and Europe, however in laboratory tests it is not possible to distinguish between antibodies produced as a result of vaccination and those produced in response to infection with the virus. Management also plays an important part in the prevention of EVA.

== Research ==
Zinc ionophores show antiviral activity against Equine viral arteritis.

== History ==
The virus causing EVA was first identified following an outbreak of respiratory disease and spontaneous abortion on a horse farm in Ohio in 1953. The first outbreak of EVA in the UK was in 1993. The outbreak affected six premises and around 100 horses were infected. Further spread of the virus was prevented by movement restrictions.

== See also ==
- Equine arteritis virus leader TRS hairpin (LTH)
- Virology
- Ionophore
