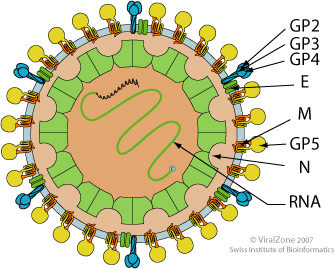
- Simarterivirus virion

Virus classification
- (unranked): Virus
- Realm: Riboviria
- Kingdom: Orthornavirae
- Phylum: Pisuviricota
- Class: Pisoniviricetes
- Order: Nidovirales
- Family: Arteriviridae
- Subfamily: Simarterivirinae

= Simarterivirinae =

Subfamily of viruses

Simarterivirinae is a subfamily of enveloped, positive-strand RNA viruses which infect vertebrate. The subfamily is in the family Arteriviridae and order Nidovirales. The subfamily contains six genera.

== Structure ==
Member viruses are enveloped, spherical, and 45–60 nm in diameter.

== Genome ==
Variarteriviruses have a positive-sense single-stranded RNA genome.

== Taxonomy ==
The subfamily Simarterivirinae contains six genera:

- Deltaarterivirus
- Epsilonarterivirus
- Etaarterivirus
- Iotaarterivirus
- Thetaarterivirus
- Zetaarterivirus
