= Joan Lunney =

Animal researcher

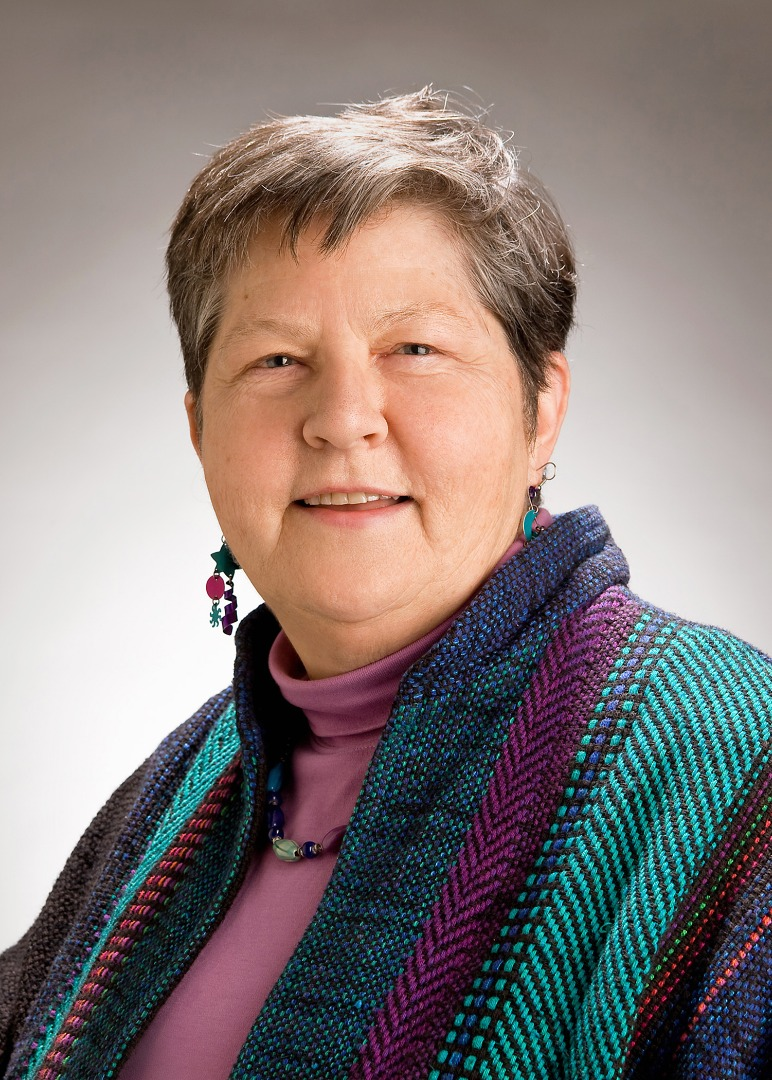
- Education: Johns Hopkins University
- Scientific career
- Thesis: Studies on the regulation of serum glycoprotein homeostatis (1976)

Joan Katherine Lunney is an American government scientific researcher at the United States Department of Agriculture's Agricultural Research Service. She is known for her work on swine immunology and genetics. She is an elected member of the American Association for the Advancement of Science.

== Education and training ==
Joan Lunney received her B.S. degree in chemistry from Chestnut Hill College in Philadelphia, Pennsylvania, in 1968. Following college she was a high school teacher at Camden Catholic High School in Cherry Hill, NJ. Lunney became interested in pursuing a research career after being exposed to summer research at the Corning Glass Works and at American University. She went on to receive her Ph.D. in Biochemistry from Johns Hopkins University in 1976. Lunney then worked as a postdoctoral research associate at the National Institutes of Health within the immunology branch before joining the United States Department of Agriculture's Agricultural Research Service in 1983.

== Research ==
Lunney is recognized internationally for her research accomplishments in swine immunogenetics. Lunney has worked on swine major histocompatibility complex (MHC), specifically the swine leukocyte antigen (SLA) complex. She has contributed to knowledge of how the MHC antigens are recognized by the immune system, which is important in xenotransplantation, and developed the first set of monoclonal antibodies to pig immune cell subsets. She identified swine genetically resistant to Trichinella spiralis. Her subsequent research was on porcine reproductive and respiratory syndrome (PRRS), and identifying genetic markers associated with disease resistant pigs.

== Honors and awards ==
Lunney was elected a fellow of the American Association for the Advancement of Science in 1998. In 2007, Chestnut College recognized her for distinguishes achievement. She was named to the Hall of Fame for the Agriculture Research Service in 2019. Lunney was named a Meritorious Senior Professional in President Biden's 2022 Presidential Rank Awards.

== Selected publications ==
- Groenen, Martien A. M.; Archibald, Alan L.; Uenishi, Hirohide; Tuggle, Christopher K.; Takeuchi, Yasuhiro; Rothschild, Max F.; Rogel-Gaillard, Claire; Park, Chankyu; Milan, Denis; Megens, Hendrik-Jan; Li, Shengting (2012). "Analyses of pig genomes provide insight into porcine demography and evolution". Nature. 491 (7424): 393–398. Bibcode:2012Natur.491..393G. doi:10.1038/nature11622. ISSN 0028-0836. PMC 3566564. PMID 23151582.
- Lunney, Joan K. (2007). "Advances in Swine Biomedical Model Genomics". International Journal of Biological Sciences. 3 (3): 179–184. doi:10.7150/ijbs.3.179. ISSN 1449-2288. PMC 1802015. PMID 17384736.
- Lunney, Joan K.; Fang, Ying; Ladinig, Andrea; Chen, Nanhua; Li, Yanhua; Rowland, Bob; Renukaradhya, Gourapura J. (2016-02-15). "Porcine Reproductive and Respiratory Syndrome Virus (PRRSV): Pathogenesis and Interaction with the Immune System". Annual Review of Animal Biosciences. 4 (1): 129–154. doi:10.1146/annurev-animal-022114-111025. ISSN 2165-8102. PMID 26646630.
