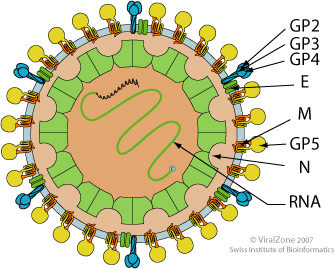
- Variarterivirus virion

Virus classification
- (unranked): Virus
- Realm: Riboviria
- Kingdom: Orthornavirae
- Phylum: Pisuviricota
- Class: Pisoniviricetes
- Order: Nidovirales
- Family: Arteriviridae
- Subfamily: Variarterivirinae

= Variarterivirinae =

Subfamily of viruses

Variarterivirinae is a subfamily of enveloped, positive-strand RNA viruses which infect vertebrates. The subfamily is in the family Arteriviridae and order Nidovirales. The subfamily contains three genera.

== Structure ==
Member viruses are enveloped, spherical, and 45–60 nm in diameter.

== Genome ==
Variarteriviruses have a positive-sense single-stranded RNA genome.

== Taxonomy ==
The subfamily Variarterivirinae contains three genera:

- Betaarterivirus
- Gammaarterivirus
- Nuarterivirus
