= ATCvet code QI09 =

Veterinary medical products classification subgroup

ATCvet code QI09 Immunologicals for Suidae is a therapeutic subgroup of the Anatomical Therapeutic Chemical Classification System for veterinary medicinal products, a system of alphanumeric codes developed by the World Health Organization (WHO) for the classification of drugs and other medical products for veterinary use. Subgroup QI09 is part of the anatomical group QI Immunologicals.

National versions of the ATC classification may include additional codes not present in this list, which follows the WHO version.

== QI09A Pig ==
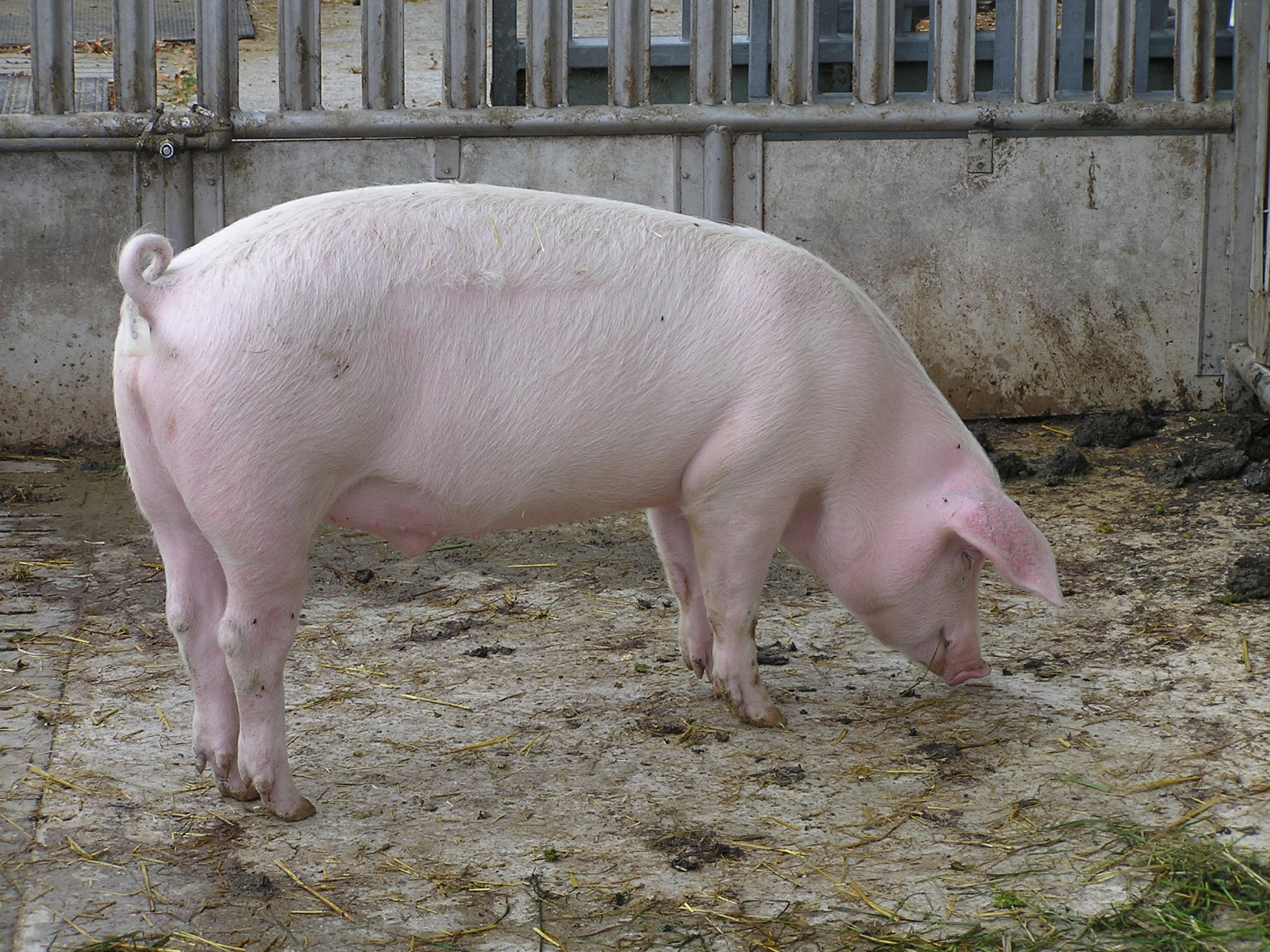

=== QI09AA Inactivated viral vaccines ===
QI09AA01 Aujeszky's disease virus
QI09AA02 Porcine parvovirus
QI09AA03 Porcine influenza virus
QI09AA04 Aujeszky's disease virus + porcine influenza virus
QI09AA05 Porcine reproductive and respiratory syndrome (PRRS) virus
QI09AA06 Classical swine fever virus
QI09AA07 Porcine circovirus

=== QI09AB Inactivated bacterial vaccines (including mycoplasma, toxoid and chlamydia) ===
QI09AB01 Treponema
QI09AB02 Escherichia
QI09AB03 Erysipelothrix
QI09AB04 Bordetella + pasteurella
QI09AB05 Pasteurella
QI09AB06 Actinobacillus/haemophilus + pasteurella
QI09AB07 Actinobacillus/haemophilus vaccine
QI09AB08 Escherichia + clostridium
QI09AB09 Escherichia + erysipelothrix
QI09AB10 Pasteurella + staphylococcus + corynebacterium
QI09AB11 Escherichia + pasteurella + salmonella + streptococcus
QI09AB12 Clostridium
QI09AB13 Mycoplasma
QI09AB14 Salmonella
QI09AB15 Escherichia + erysipelothrix + clostridium
QI09AB16 Bordetella + pasteurella + mycoplasma
QI09AB17 Mycoplasma + haemophilus
QI09AB18 Lawsonia

=== QI09AC Inactivated bacterial vaccines and antisera ===
Empty group

=== QI09AD Live viral vaccines ===
QI09AD01 Aujeszky's disease virus
QI09AD02 Porcine transmissible gastro-enteritis (TGE) virus
QI09AD03 Porcine reproductive and respiratory syndrome (PRRS) virus
QI09AD04 Classical swine fever virus

=== QI09AE Live bacterial vaccines ===
QI09AE01 Erysipelothrix
QI09AE02 Salmonella
QI09AE03 Escherichia
QI09AE04 Lawsonia

=== QI09AF Live bacterial and viral vaccines ===
Empty group

=== QI09AG Live and inactivated bacterial vaccines ===
Empty group

=== QI09AH Live and inactivated viral vaccines ===
QI09AH01 Live aujeszky's disease virus + inactivated porcine influenza virus

=== QI09AI Live viral and inactivated bacterial vaccines ===
Empty group

=== QI09AJ Live and inactivated viral and bacterial vaccines ===
Empty group

=== QI09AK Inactivated viral and live bacterial vaccines ===
Empty group

=== QI09AL Inactivated viral and inactivated bacterial vaccines ===
QI09AL01 Porcine parvovirus + erysipelothrix
QI09AL02 Porcine rotavirus + escherichia
QI09AL03 Porcine parvovirus + escherichia + erysipelothrix
QI09AL04 Porcine influenza virus + erysipelothrix
QI09AL05 Porcine transmissible gastro-enteritis virus + escherichia + clostridium
QI09AL06 Porcine parvovirus + porcine influenza virus + erysipelothrix
QI09AL07 Porcine parvovirus + erysipelothrix + leptospira
QI09AL08 Porcine circovirus + mycoplasma

=== QI09AM Antisera, immunoglobulin preparations, and antitoxins ===
QI09AM01 Escherichia antiserum
QI09AM02 Pasteurella antiserum
QI09AM03 Erysipelothrix antiserum
QI09AM04 Clostridium antiserum

=== QI09AN Live parasitic vaccines ===
Empty group

=== QI09AO Inactivated parasitic vaccines ===
Empty group

=== QI09AP Live fungal vaccines ===
Empty group

=== QI09AQ Inactivated fungal vaccines ===
Empty group

=== QI09AR In vivo diagnostic preparations ===
Empty group

=== QI09AS Allergens ===
Empty group

=== QI09AT Colostrum preparations and substitutes ===
Empty group

=== QI09AU Other live vaccines ===
Empty group

=== QI09AV Other inactivated vaccines ===
Empty group

=== QI09AX Other immunologicals ===
Empty group

== QI09X Suidae, others ==
Empty group
