= Genetically modified vaccine =

Most vaccines consist of viruses that have been attenuated, disabled, weakened or killed in some way so that their virulent properties are no longer effective. A simple genetically modified vaccine, based on a thymidine kinase deficient mutant of pseudorabies virus was reportedly available as early as 2001 as a commercial vaccine to control Aujeszky's disease in Europe, North America and Japan.
