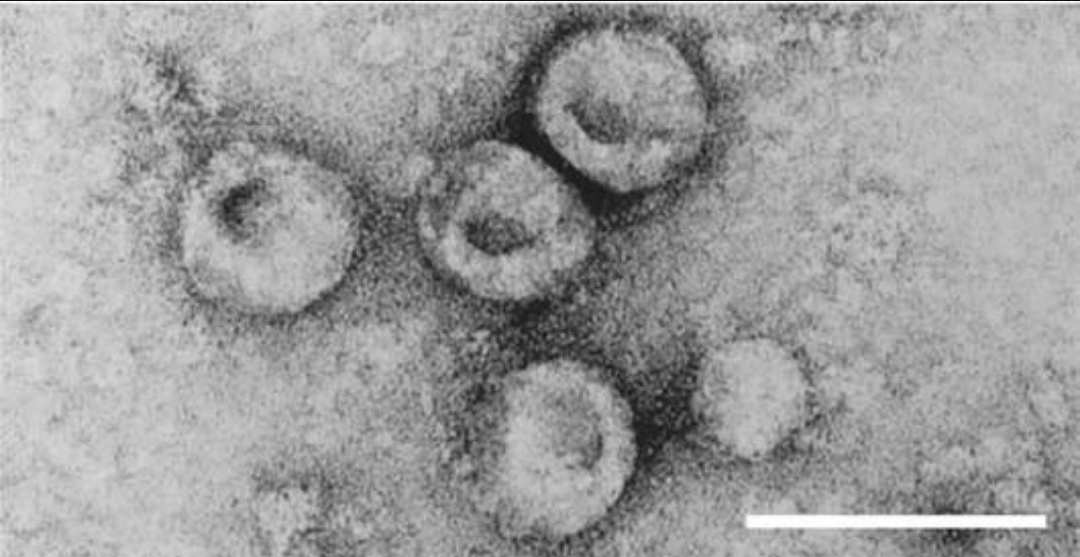
- Virions of Orthopestivirus sp.

Virus classification
- (unranked): Virus
- Realm: Riboviria
- Kingdom: Orthornavirae
- Phylum: Kitrinoviricota
- Class: Flasuviricetes
- Order: Amarillovirales
- Family: Pestiviridae
- Genus: Orthopestivirus

Species
- See text

Synonyms
- Pestivirus

= Orthopestivirus =

Genus of viruses

Orthopestivirus, formerly called Pestivirus, is a genus of viruses in the family Pestiviridae. Viruses in the genus infect mammals, including members of the family Bovidae (which includes cattle, sheep, and goats) and the family Suidae (which includes various species of swine). There are 19 species in this genus. Diseases associated with this genus include: hemorrhagic syndromes, abortion, and fatal mucosal disease.

== Structure ==
Viruses in Orthopestivirus are enveloped, with spherical geometries. Their diameter is around 50 nm. Genomes are linear and not segmented, around 12kb in length.

Genus	Structure	Symmetry	Capsid	Genomic arrangement	Genomic segmentation
Orthopestivirus	Icosahedral-like	Pseudo T=3	Enveloped	Linear	Monopartite

== Lifecycle ==
Entry into the host cell is achieved by attachment of the viral envelope protein E2 to host receptors, which mediates clathrin-mediated endocytosis. The main viral replication process happens in host cytoplasm. Replication follows the positive strand RNA virus replication model. An IRES RNA element at the 5'-nontranslated region (NTR) of the viral genome recruits viral and cellular translation factors to initiate viral protein translation. Viral proteins are first translated as polyprotein, and then processed into individual structure and non-structure proteins by both viral and host proteases. The virus exits the host cell by budding. Mammals serve as the natural hosts.When infected, the host sheds viruses in almost all body secretions including saliva, nasal discharge, milk, and faeces. Vertical transmission (viruses crossing the placenta and infecting the fetus) are also common.

Genus	Host details	Tissue tropism	Entry details	Release details	Replication site	Assembly site	Transmission
Orthopestivirus	Mammals	None	Clathrin-mediated endocytosis	Secretion	Cytoplasm	Cytoplasm	Horizontal and Vertical

== Genome ==
Orthopestivirus viruses have a single strand of positive-sense RNA (i.e. RNA which can be directly translated into viral proteins) that is around 12.5 kilobases (kb) long (equal to the length of 12,500 nucleotides), but due to recombination events has been observed up to 16.5 kilobases in length. Sometimes, virions (individual virus particles) contain sections of an animal's genome that have been duplicated, though this is not normally the case. Although lacking Poly-A tail at the 3' end of the genome, it contains stem-loop regions that might be involved in viral translation and replication. The genome contains RNA to encode both structural and nonstructural proteins. The molecular biology of pestiviruses shares many similarities and peculiarities with the human hepaciviruses. Genome organisation and translation strategy are highly similar for the members of both genera. For BVDV, frequently nonhomologous RNA recombination events lead to the appearance of genetically distinct viruses that are lethal to the host.

== Transmission and prevention ==
Bovine viral diarrhea virus (BVDV) is widespread in Australia, mainly in cattle. Some adult cattle are immune to the disease, while others are lifelong carriers. If a foetus becomes infected within the first three to four months of gestation, then it will fail to develop antibodies towards the virus. In these cases, the animals often die before birth or shortly after. It is spread very easily among feedlot cattle as nasal secretions and close contact spread the disease, and animals with infected mucous membranes give off millions of particles of BVDV a day.

Symptoms of Orthopestivirus infection include diarrhoea, respiratory problems, and bleeding disorders.

Bovine viral diarrhea virus vaccines exist and the correct vaccine strain should be given, depending on the herd's location and the endemic strain in that region. This vaccination must be given regularly to maintain immunity.

== Vaccines ==
There are 120 registered BVD vaccine products currently used around the world, mainly in North and South America. These are conventional modified live virus (MLV) or inactivated/killed virus vaccines. In pregnant animals live vaccines pose significant risk of vertical transmission of vaccine virus that can occasionally result in complications for calves. Most of the harm done by BVDV is to unborn calves and depends on the timing of infection. Vaccination has not proved to be effective for Bovine Viral Diarrhea (BVD), as the presence of BVD has not lessened since the vaccine has been developed. Animals who are affected by the virus during early fetal development may become persistently infected (PI) and lack an immune response to BVD. These animal’s presence in herds and them shedding virus can infect other animals in the herd before vaccination is possible. PI animals do not produce antibodies and are the main source of infection for herds, so culling is necessary to eradicate infection sources. Vaccines are not able to prevent fetal infections, so this poses a huge source of infection for cattle herds. Another reason for the inefficiency of the BVD vaccine is because of failure to vaccinate whole areas, rather than just individual herds. Border Disease, which affects lambs, is also caused by an orthopestivirus, but has no vaccine at this time. Marker vaccines are beneficial tools for the eradication of animal diseases in regions with a high prevalence of the designated disease. The chimeric CP7_E2alf used to see how altered cell tropism affects pigs may not only serve as a tool for a better understanding of Pestivirus attachment, entry, and assembly, but also represent modified live CSFV "marker vaccines."

== Structural and non-structural proteins ==
Genomic RNA of orthopestiviruses is translated into a large polyprotein that is divided into several proteins. It has a single big open reading frame (ORF) that can encode roughly 4000 amino acids and a positive-sense ssRNA genome. Among the structural proteins that are N terminal in this polyprotein are three glycoproteins, which are referred to as E0, E1, and E2 depending on the order in which they end up appearing in the polyprotein. The nucleocapsid protein C and the three envelope glycoproteins Erns, E1, and E2 are the virion's structural components. Beginning with a nascent cleavage between the precursor ErnsE1E2 and the capsid protein, glycoprotein processing is then carried out by cleavage at the C-terminal end of E2. After being split into ErnsE1 and E2, ErnsE1 is then transformed into Erns and E1. A host signal peptidase located in the endoplasmic reticulum's lumen catalyzes the cleavage between Erns and E1, as well as that between E1 and E2 (ER). A new type of signal peptidase cleavage site is identified in an RNA virus polyprotein. The most important structural protein is E2, which regulates cell tropism by interacting with cell surface receptors and inducing responses from cytotoxic T-lymphocytes and neutralizing antibodies. E2 is a type I transmembrane protein and has a mass of 55 kDa. All three glycoproteins aid in the attachment of the virus and its entry into target cells. Viral entry and contagiousness require heterodimeric E1–E2 molecules. E1 is categorized as a type I transmembrane protein and has a mass of 33 kDa. Of the three glycoproteins, the functions of E1 are the least developed and least understood. A virus's glycoproteins must perform a variety of tasks throughout its life cycle in order for the virus to successfully infect cells or animals, multiply, and then leave the affected cells. These activities can be broken down into the three mutually exclusive categories of interacting with hosts to sustain itself throughout the animal population, interacting with cells to infect and replicate, and connecting with other viral proteins to form viable virions. Although it lacks a hydrophobic anchor sequence, the structural glycoprotein E(rns) of orthopestiviruses has been found to be connected to the virion and to membranes in infected cells via its COOH terminus. Erns, an envelope glycoprotein, was recently recognized as an RNase. RNases have a variety of biological effects. They have been proven to be immunosuppressive, neurotoxic, and antihelminthic. Erns severely reduced the protein synthesis of various kinds of lymphocytes without causing cell membrane damage. Symptoms of orthopestivirus infections include leukopenia and immunosuppression. In the pathogenesis of orthopestiviruses, ERNS is crucial. An orthopestivirus envelope glycoprotein called ERNS is crucial for virus attachment and cell infection. Erns lacks a transmembrane domain, unlike the other two envelope proteins E1 and E2, and a significant amount is secreted into the medium of infected. Erns's C-terminus serves as a membrane anchor, a retention/secretion signal, a binding site for cell surface glycosaminoglycans (GAGs), a signal peptidase cleavage site, and more. Erns has a mass of 44–48 kDa. The protein is also present in some pure orthopestivirus virions, which begs the crucial and fascinating question of how it attaches to the orthopestivirus envelope. Virus-neutralizing antibodies primarily target the orthopestivirus E2 glycoproteins, which also function in receptor binding and host range limiting. At the moment where orthopestiviruses enter cells, their host specificity is probably influenced by the sequence and structure of E2. Enveloped viruses have created a variety of crafty invasion methods. For cell attachment and membrane fusion to occur, one or more viral envelope glycoproteins are required. In contrast to orthopestiviruses and orthohepacivirus, which both have two envelope glycoproteins, E1 and E2, members of the Flaviviridae family, such as orthoflaviviruses, only have one glycoprotein, E, in their envelope. Although E2 participates in cell attachment, it is not yet known which protein causes membrane fusion.

The bovine viral diarrhea virus (BVDV) is what causes bovine viral diarrhea (BVD). Bovine viral diarrhea virus type 1 (BVDV-1), Bovine viral diarrhea virus type 2 (BVDV-2), Border disease virus (BDV), and Classical swine fever (CSF) virus are the four recognized species in the genus Orthopestivirus of the family Pestiviridae. Although progress has been made in recent decades in identifying the activities of the BVDV NSPs, research on the virus still mostly focuses on its structural protein. Understanding BVDV non-structural proteins would assist researchers to better comprehend viral replication and the molecular basis of viral persistent infection. Eight non-structural proteins (NSPs) are encoded by the bovine viral diarrhea virus (BVDV) (i.e., Npro, p7, NS2, NS3, NS4A, NS4B, NS5A, and NS5B). A single open reading frame is encoded by a singular, single-stranded, positive-stranded RNA of 12.3–16.5 kb in the BVDV (ORF). The coding sequence is NH2, and the ORF can be split into various parts to encode polyproteins: –Npro (p20) (p20) –C (p14) (p14) -Erns/E0(gp48), -E1(gp25), -E2(gp53), -p7, NS2(p54), -NS3(p80), -NS4A(p10), -NS4B(p30), -NS5A(p58), -NS5B(p75), -COOH. Individually or collectively, these proteins are involved in viral replication, transcription, and translation. Npro (p20), a protein specific to orthopestivirus with a molecular weight of roughly 20 kDa, is the first protein generated from the N-terminus of the viral polyprotein. BVDV Npro is a hydrophilic outer membrane protein that primarily consists of beta-sheets and random curling. It lacks a signal peptide. Npro is also a self-protease that can catalyze the breakdown of developing polyproteins to create the BVDV C protein. Infected animals have innate immune suppression as a result of BVDV Npro's capacity to control the generation or inhibition of type I interferon (IFN-I) and alter the virus' ability to replicate. A 6–7 kDa polypeptide generated from E2 called viral protein p7 has two domains. The other domain, which is present throughout infection in the cell as free p7 or E2–p7, is released by signal peptidase interpretation and is found at the C-terminus of E2 without being cleaved. However, because p7 was not found in BVDV particles, it was categorized as a non-structural protein. Although BVDV p7 can aid in the production of contagious BVDV particles and encourage virus release, the exact mechanisms behind these actions are still unknown. With 450 amino acids, NS2 (p54) is a cysteine protease. A shared domain of the C-terminal protease structure and a hydrophobic N-terminal half-anchored protein membrane make up this structure. NS2-NS3 cleavage is mediated by the self-protease in NS2, which may effectively cleave into NS2 and NS3 in the early stages of infection, and the degree of NS2–NS3 cleavage controls BVDV from RNA replication to morphological alterations. Additionally, when the BVDV virus infects a cell, the cell chaperone DNAJC14 joins forces with the viral NS2–NS3 to facilitate the activation of the NS2 protease and the release of NS3, which facilitates the production of virions. As a target antigen for ELISA BVDV detection, NS3 is a multifunctional protein with serine protease activity, helicase activity, and nucleoside triphosphatase (NTPase) activity. Although it plays a significant role in the BVDV replicase and controls the viral RNAs ability to replicate, NS3 has little impact on the assembly of the virus. Only in the NS3/NS4A complex can the NS3 protease reach peak activity, after which the C-terminus of NS3 cleaves all downstream proteins. The replication of viral RNA will be hampered by the inactivation of the NS3 protease, helicase, and NTPase. Normal detection limits for the NS2–NS3 (p125) protein in Ncp and Cp BVDV-infected cells are 120 kDa. The cleavage of NS2–NS3 is connected to the replication of the virus in the early stages of virus infection. A complex known as NS2–NS3/NS4A (NS2–3/4A) is created when NS4A joins with uncleaved NS2–NS3 (NS2–3) or NS3/NS4A. It can be utilized to support RNA replication and virus assembly as the fundamental element of virus particles. In the NS3/NS4A serine protease complex, NS4A functions as a protease cofactor, engaging with NS3 to catalyze the cleavage of downstream proteins NS4B, NS5A, and NS5B. In particle assembly, NS2 and NS3 can replace uncut NS2–NS3 molecules, but the precise mechanism is still unknown. A 35 kDa hydrophobic protein with NTPase activity called NS4B (p30) is involved in the replication of the BVDV genome. Due to interactions between the viral Npro, Erns, and NS4B and the host immune signaling pathways, BVDV can bypass the host immune response and cause persistent infection in cattle by blocking their innate immune responses. The primary target for the diagnosis of diseases, the creation of vaccines, and the management of infections is NS4B. After viral infection, NS4B can trigger humoral and cellular immune responses thanks to its highly conserved epitopes. NS5B (p75), which features a functional motif typical of viral RNA-dependent RNA polymerase, is roughly 77 kDa in size (RdRp). It primarily participates in the process of virus-infected cell membrane rearrangement and catalyzes the creation of viral RNA. The C-terminus of the BVDV polyprotein is where the NS5A (p58) and NS5B (p75) are separated. Infected cells typically contain NS5A (p58) as a single protein or as an uncleaved NS5A-NS5B complex. A hydrophilic, phosphorylated protein with a molecular weight of 58 kDa called NS5A is a part of the viral replicase. Although NS5B has a significant impact on RNA replication, its lack of specificity may have an impact on the design of viral replicase. A number of issues, including the pathogenic mechanism, the regulation of virus replication, and the interaction between p7, NS4B, NS5A, and other NSP, remain unresolved.

== Species ==
The genus contains the following species, listed by scientific name and followed by their common names:

- Orthopestivirus agnis
- Orthopestivirus antilocaprae
- Orthopestivirus apodemuris
- Orthopestivirus australiaense
- Orthopestivirus aydinense
- Orthopestivirus bovis, or Bovine viral diarrhea virus 1 (BVDV-1), causes Bovine viral diarrhea and Mucosal disease
- Orthopestivirus brazilense
- Orthopestivirus caprinae
- Orthopestivirus giraffae
- Orthopestivirus manidae
- Orthopestivirus niviventris
- Orthopestivirus ovis, or Border disease virus (BDV), causes Border disease
- Orthopestivirus phocoenae
- Orthopestivirus ratti
- Orthopestivirus scotophili
- Orthopestivirus scrofae
- Orthopestivirus steiermarkense
- Orthopestivirus suis, or Classical swine fever virus (CSFV), causes Classical swine fever
- Orthopestivirus tauri, or Bovine viral diarrhea virus 2 or (BVDV-2), causes Bovine viral diarrhea and Mucosal disease

== See also ==
- Virology
- Animal virology
