= 2007 Central Luzon hog cholera outbreak =

Disease outbreak in the Philippines

In mid-2007, an outbreak of classical swine fever or hog cholera had affected the Central Luzon region of the Philippines, particularly in the provinces of Bulacan and Pampanga, as confirmed by the Department of Agriculture (DA).

== Statistics ==
Bulacan, which lies immediately north of Metro Manila, is the center of hog raising in the Philippines. Backyard and commercial farms, about 300 in number, with 80% of those commercial, are estimated to have more than a million sows.

== Outbreak ==
The outbreak was originally confined on early July to backyard farms in three towns, but expanded to 43 barangays in 12 municipalities (of 21 municipalities and three cities) in Bulacan. Commercial farms, which are 80% of the farms, were unaffected, according to provincial veterinarian Felipe Bartolome. Bartolome also dismissed the cases of foot-and-mouth disease in the province, and the hog cholera only affected about 3,000–5,000 sows. The DA assured the public that pork prices would remain stable and that the supply of pork in Metro Manila would not be affected.

As a result of the outbreak, the DA issued a memorandum to prevent the spread of hog cholera virus in Central Luzon, containing quarantine policies to prevent further spread of the virus and information dissemination on proper hog hygiene.

At the end of July, DA's Bureau of Animal Industry via a report of its officer-in-charge Davinio Catbagan to DA secretary Arthur Yap said, "hog cholera, swine flu, and the pseudo-rabies virus that hit some farms have now been placed under control through measures the Department of Agriculture immediately put in place." The DA released 5,000 doses of hog cholera vaccine in the province to curtail the outbreak. In its estimate, the DA said only 4,000 sows, 2,000 each in Bulacan and Pampanga, were affected. Furthermore, the National Meat Inspection Service strictly monitored the movement of hogs and newly slaughtered meat. The final count for Bulacan was pegged at 2,823 affected hogs, representing a minimal 0.29% of the total hog population of over one million in Bulacan, in 43 barangays in 11 towns and one city.

== Response ==
As a result of the outbreak, police checkpoints were placed along the roads entering Metro Manila. A routine inspection seized 400 kilograms (880 lb) of "hot meat" in Santa Maria, Bulacan, while Quezon City officials confiscated five tons of meat from Balintawak public market during a surprise inspection.
