= Porcine reproductive and respiratory syndrome virus 2 =

Betaarterivirus americense

Virus classification
- (unranked): Virus
- Realm: Riboviria
- Kingdom: Orthornavirae
- Phylum: Pisuviricota
- Class: Pisoniviricetes
- Order: Nidovirales
- Family: Arteriviridae
- Genus: Betaarterivirus
- Subgenus: Ampobartevirus
- Species: Betaarterivirus americense

Synonyms
- Porcine reproductive and respiratory syndrome virus 2

Species of virus

Porcine reproductive and respiratory syndrome virus 2 (Betaarterivirus americense) is a species of enveloped, positive-strand RNA viruses which infect domestic pigs. It is one of two porcine reproductive and respiratory syndrome viruses (PRRSV). The two types of PRRSV are distinguished by which genomic cluster they are associated with. Type 1 is associated with a LV cluster. Type 2 is associated with a VR2332 cluster.

PRRSV is in the Arteriviridae family and the order Nidovirales. It has a positive sense RNA genome that is 15 kb long. This genome consists of ten open reading frames (ORFs) with a 5' untranslated region (UTR) and a 3' UTR. PRRSV causes porcine reproductive and respiratory syndrome in swine. This syndrome results in failure during breeding and respiratory problems. Type 2 PRRSV was first seen in the United States in 1987. However, it has now spread worldwide to commercial swine facilities.

Within the swine industry, porcine reproductive and respiratory syndrome causes interstitial pneumonia of grown swine and fetal death. Early gestation infection of a maternal swine can lead to embryonic infection. During mid-gestation, the fetuses are protected as the virus can not pass the placenta. However, in late state gestation transplacental infection to and from fetuses can occur and large scale reproductive failure may occur.

== Tropism ==
As a member of the family Arteriviridae, PRRSV has an in vivo and in vitro tropism for cells like macrophages or monocytes. PRRSV can then infect a subpopulation of macrophages. These can then be identified by the expression of sialoadhesin

== Viral classification ==
PRRSV type 2 has been historically classified according to RFLP (restriction fragment length polymorphism) patterns. These are characterized by displaying a cut pattern of three different enzymes (MluI, HincII and SacII) in the ORF5 portion of the PRRSV genome. Common RFLP types for are 1–7–4, 1–8–4, 2–5–2, among thousands of others. Criticism to this way of classifying the virus range from the multitude of possible combinations of different cut pattern of the three enzymes (leading to tens of thousands of different PRRSV RFLP patterns, with unknown epidemiological significance) to the quick change in RFLP types of a single virus in as few as 10 animal passages.

Because of those limitations, PRRSV type 2 has been recently classified according to phylogenetic characteristics of the ORF5 portion of the viral genome, which aggregates isolates into phylogenetic lineages based on the ancestral relationships and genetic distance among isolates. Using this methodology, PRRSV type 2 was sub-divided into 9 lineages, which are present with different prevalence across the world. Despite type 2 PRRSV being named the North American PRRSV, there are two lineages that are restricted to Asia. The other lineages had what is assumed introductions into other geographic locations such as Thailand, Canada, China and Italy. Within the U.S., the prevalence of different lineages of PRRSV change over time. It is presumed that Type 2 PRRSV was first seen in Canada after analyzing serological evidence. By 2010, of the top ten swine production states in the United States, viruses in 3 of the 9 major lineages were present. Two of the three lineages were considered major lineages because of their sample size. By 2019, at least 5 different lineages circulate in a single U.S. region, and certain lineages display complex intra-lineage variability, which has been sometimes referred to as sub-lineages. The occurrence of specific lineages in the United States are not homogeneous, certain lineages are more prevalent in specific parts of the country.

Since the 1987 classification of type 2 (North American-like) PRRSV, the virus has greatly diversified. There are three main epidemiological events that have occurred. There has been the introduction of the MN184-related cluster, acute PRRS/abortion storm, and highly pathogenic Chinese strains. The history of their incidences remain a mystery.

== Genomic diversity ==
The genetic diversity of Type 2 PRRSV continues to grow. Canada and the United States have shown the highest degree of continued diversity. In Canada, the diversity is more localized in certain areas and thought to be due to the introduction of vaccination diversity. The United States genetic diversity has increased in all geographic areas. However, Mexico contains the greatest number of genetic outliers. Researchers believe this is due to multiple reintroductions of the virus to the areas.

== Vaccinations ==
Currently, inactivated and live attenuated viruses are used to try to eliminate porcine reproductive and respiratory syndrome (PRRS). It has been found that the inactivated vaccination only induces weak neutralizing antibodies against PRRS. This type of response can create a worse infection for those who have been infected. Without a strong neutralizing vaccination, the host cells are able to attach strongly and then with weak neutralizing effects, end up getting infected easier. The live attenuated vaccine works through an unknown mechanism and only helps clinical symptoms; it does not prevent infection. It is thought that the live attenuated vaccination may also revert to the virulent form of the virus. These two vaccinations are currently not effective.

There have been many new attempts to find effective vaccinations. Researchers are currently trying to identify neutralizing antibodies that will provide true immunity against type 2 PRRSV.

== Structure ==
Type 2 PRRSV is an enveloped virus with a non-isometric nucleocapsid core. The Type 2 PRRSV genome has 10 open reading frames (ORFs) present. There are two large ORFs (ORF1a and ORF1b) that encode non-structural proteins. The remaining eight ORFs create the six main structural proteins for the virus. ORF2a, 3, 4, 5, encode glycoprotein 2,2a, 3, 4, and 5. ORF2b encodes the envelope protein. There is a newly discovered protein encoded in ORF5a that overlaps ORF5. ORF6 encodes the membrane protein. The nucleocapsid (N) protein is encoded by ORF7. The N protein is composed of 123 amino acids, produces an immune response within the cell, and is thought to be multifunctional. This protein also has five antigenic regions. A cryptic nuclear localization signal (NLS), a functional nuclear localization signal (NLS-2), and a nucleolar localization signal (NoLS) are all located on this protein as well.

== Genome replication cycle ==
=== Attachment and entry ===
It has been found that a 210-kDa membrane protein expressed on porcine alveolar macrophages (PAMS) allows PRRSV to attach to the membrane. The exact nature of this protein has not yet been identified. Infection by PRRSV can be completely blocked using monoclonal antibodies that precipitate the 210- kDa protein out of solution. However, this does not completely block attachment to the PAMs. It has been shown previously that heparin can reduce infection of Marc-145 cells (a derived cell line from the African green monkey kidney cell line). It has now been shown that binding of type 2 PRRSV binds to heparin sulfate glycosaminoglycans on the PAMs is vital to entry. PRRSV then binds to CD169 on the PAM. This binding activates receptor-mediated clathrin-dependent endocytosis. The genome enters the cytoplasm using a reaction by CD163.

=== Replication and transcription ===
Despite the genetic variation that occurs in type 2 PRRSV, a conserved stem loop in the genome has been identified. This is believed to play a role in viral replication and translation.

PRRSV is assumed to transcribe like other nidoviruses that transcribe in a discontinuous fashion. The structural proteins are translated from the 5' ends of the sub genomic (sg) mRNA 2 to 7. The 5' UTR in PRRSV consists of its 5' leader sequence. The PRRSV generates a 3' coterminal set of sgmRNAs. It has been shown that mutations within the leader transcription regulating sequence (TRS) of the type 2 PRRSV genome may inhibit proper sgmRNA translation. Intact leader TRS is required for proper sgmRNA transcription. PRRSV uses different non-conical (non-structural) body translation regulating sequences (TRS-B) to produce different sg mRNA species. Different strains have and use different TRS-Bs depending on genotype changes that have occurred. The 3' terminal C5 and C6 are conserved within different species' TRS-Bs.

It has been suggested that despite the normal anti-viral role Protein Kinase R (PKR) plays in cells, type 2 PRRSV uses PKR as a pro-viral kinase within the cell. When PKR was knocked out in Marc-145 cells, Type-2 PRRSV strain 23983 replication decreased. Therefore, it is assumed that PKR plays a pro-viral role by affecting PRRSV transcription.

ORF1a and ORF1b are translated to create two large proteins. Processing of these precursor proteins creates at least 14 nonstructural proteins. The processing is regulated by four main viral proteases. Most of the nonstructural protein (NSPs) assemble and create a complex called the replication and transcription complex (RTC). The complexes then accumulate in the endoplasmic reticulum double membrane vesicles. These complexes direct both replication and transcription.

Besides these hints, the exact way in which type 2 PRRSV translates remains a mystery.

=== Assembly and release ===
At the end of replication, the nucleocapsid proteins surround the newly made genome. The new nucleocapsid complex buds from the smooth endoplasmic reticulum and the golgi complex. Through this process the new capsid obtains the required six viral envelope proteins. The new virions then go into the extracellular space via exocytosis.

The type 2 PRRSV infection induces the unfolded protein response (UPR) within the cell, also known as the endoplasmic reticulum (ER) stress response. This response triggers the function of c-Jun N-terminal kinases (JNK). The activation of JNK leads to p53 and Akt activation which in turn lead to apoptosis of the cell. It is thought that this apoptosis of the host cell plays a significant role in the pathogenesis of the type 2 PRRSV infection.

== Modulation of host processes ==
One main way that Type 2 PRRSV modulates the host cell is through the activation of the inflammatory response. This pro-inflammatory response in host cells oftentimes most visibly results in interstitial pneumonia of the infected swine. It has now been found that type 2 PRRSV increases the NF - KB-driven inflammatory cytokine response. This response activates the DHX36-MyD88-P65 signaling cascade. When researchers knocked out DHX36, the activation of NF-κB signaling by PRRSV and nucleocapsid (N) protein was inhibited. Because of this experiment it is now known that type 2 PRRFSV using its N protein to induce the NF-κB response. Type 2 PRRSV is able to induce this response through the interaction between the N protein and DHX36. This interaction is made possible through the N-terminal of the DHX36.
