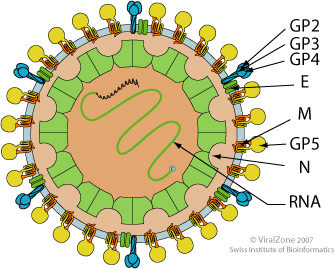
- Betaarterivirus virion

Virus classification
- (unranked): Virus
- Realm: Riboviria
- Kingdom: Orthornavirae
- Phylum: Pisuviricota
- Class: Pisoniviricetes
- Order: Nidovirales
- Family: Arteriviridae
- Subfamily: Variarterivirinae
- Genus: Betaarterivirus

= Betaarterivirus =

Genus of viruses

Betaarterivirus is a genus of enveloped, positive-strand RNA viruses which infect vertebrates. The genus is in the family Arteriviridae and order Nidovirales. The genus contains four subgenera and six species.

== Structure ==
Member viruses are enveloped, spherical, and 45–60 nm in diameter.

== Genome ==
Betaarteriviruses have a positive-sense single-stranded RNA genome.

== Taxonomy ==
The genus Betaarterivirus contains the following subgenera and species:

- Ampobartevirus
  - Betaarterivirus americense
- Chibartevirus
  - Betaarterivirus chinrav
  - Betaarterivirus ninrav
  - Betaarterivirus sheoin
- Eurpobartevirus
  - Betaarterivirus europensis
- Mibartevirus
  - Betaarterivirus timiclar
