= Border disease =

Border disease virus

Virus classification
- (unranked): Virus
- Realm: Riboviria
- Kingdom: Orthornavirae
- Phylum: Kitrinoviricota
- Class: Flasuviricetes
- Order: Amarillovirales
- Family: Pestiviridae
- Genus: Orthopestivirus
- Species: Orthopestivirus ovis

Synonyms
- Border disease virus

Viral disease of sheep and goats caused by Pestivirus D

Border disease (BD) is a viral disease of sheep and goats, primarily causing congenital diseases, but can also cause acute and persistent infections. It first appeared in the border regions of England and Wales in 1959, and has since spread world-wide. Lambs that are born with BD are commonly known as 'hairy shakers' due to the primary presentation of the disease. The disease was recognized before the virus, therefore the common name of the disease predates the understanding of the viral pathology. The virus can cause a significant reduction in the percentage of surviving lambs, thus it has a large economic impact on farmers.

== Virus ==
Border disease is caused by "Border disease virus" (BDV), in the family Flaviviridae. It is the same virus causing the disease. It was given a scientific name in 2018 by the International Committee on Taxonomy of Viruses, after it had been identified. This virus is not host exclusive. It is noncytopathogenic, meaning it does not kill its host cells.

== Epidemiology ==
Transmission is vertical or horizontal by nose to nose contact. The main source of infection is persistently infected animals. While border disease is caused by border disease virus, in areas of the world where close contact between sheep and goats and cattle occurs, similar clinical signs may be caused in sheep and goats by bovine viral diarrhea virus (BVDV). It is therefore important to identify truly infected animals through direct detection of the virus by finding viral RNA in the blood or tissues, or by isolating the virus, growing it in a cell culture, and identifying it with immunostaining.

== Vaccination ==
No vaccines are specifically licensed for Border Disease Virus (BDV) in the UK or the United States, although limited commercial options exist in mainland Europe. Management relies on biosecurity, identifying and culling persistently infected (PI) animals, and screening replacement livestock, as BVDV vaccines offer only partial cross-protection.

Control is established through blood-testing sheep, and culling seropositive animals.

== Clinical signs ==
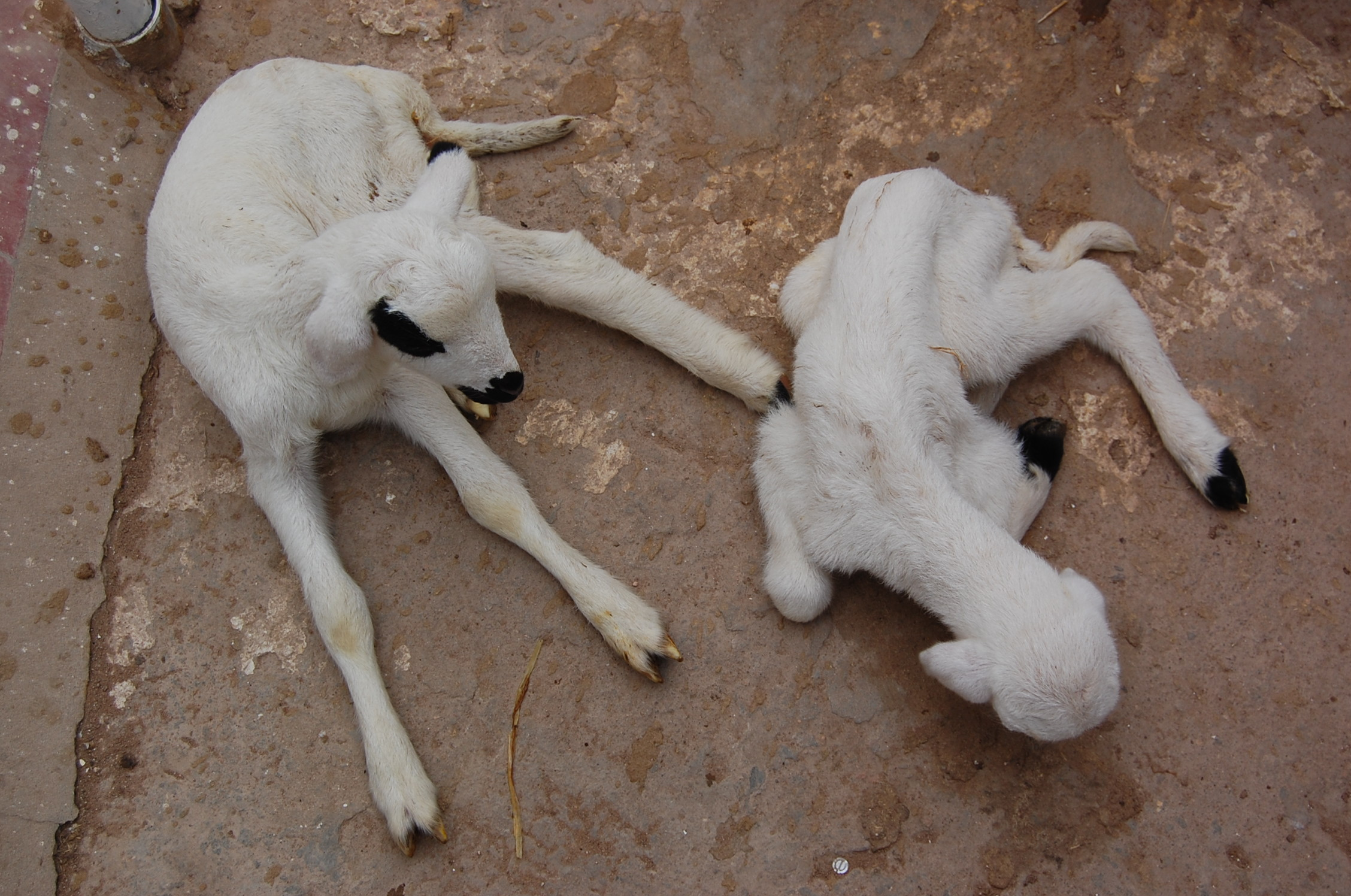
Lambs with Border disease

=== Acute infection ===
Most healthy animals will only experience subclinical disease or very mild infection. A slight fever and a mild leukopenia may be seen with a short-lived viremia, detectable between days 4-11 post infection, at which point the virus is neutralized by the animal's immune system.

=== Fetal infection ===
While the level of evident maternal infection may be minimal, the consequences for the fetus are serious before day 85 of gestation. After day 85, the lamb is most likely to be born normal with antibodies to the virus, given the state of the fetal immune system at this stage in gestation.

Fetal infection manifests as four syndromes:

1. Early embryonic mortality
2. Abortion and stillbirth
3. Congenital malformation
4. Birth of small weak lambs with immunosuppression

The animals that do survive to live birth will frequently show the 'hairy shaker' signs. The virus gathers in fetal lymphoid tissue, hair follicles, and the central nervous system. The 'hairy shakers' are born with hair (not wool) and the shaking comes from cerebellar hypoplasia.

=== Persistent viraemia ===
Fetuses that are infected between 60 and 85 days of gestation have a 50% chance of survival. The fetus is not immunocompetent at this stage and viral replication within fetal tissues is uncontrolled. Fetuses that survive infection at this stage of gestation will be tolerant of the virus and their immune system will not properly respond to it. As such there is no inflammatory response, but the characteristic 'hairy shaker' changes are still present. Some animals will continue to survive with viremia, while most will die by 6 months of age.

== Diagnosis ==
Diagnosis is made through observation of clinical signs, presence of disease in the area, and confirmation made by serology: ELISA for virus antigen.
