= Equine arteritis virus leader TRS hairpin (LTH) =

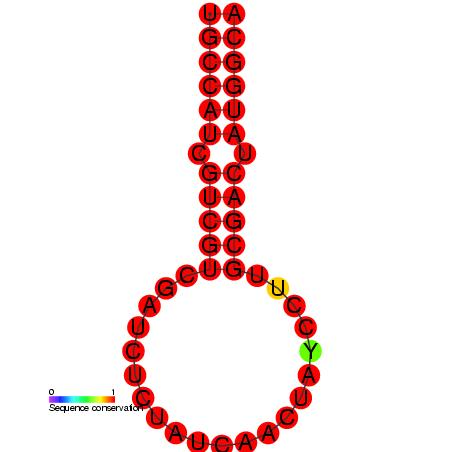
- Predicted secondary structure and sequence conservation of EAV_LTH

Identifiers
- Symbol: EAV_LTH
- Rfam: RF00498

Other data
- RNA type: Cis-reg; leader
- Domain(s): Viruses
- SO: SO:0000233
- PDB structures: PDBe

The equine arteritis virus leader transcription-regulating sequence hairpin (LTH) is as RNA element that is thought to be a key structural element in discontinuous subgenomic RNA synthesis and is critical for leader transcription-regulating sequences (TRS) function. Similar structures have been predicted in other arteriviruses and coronaviruses.
