= Marker vaccine =

Vaccine allowing later recipient identification

A marker vaccine is a vaccine which allows for immunological differentiation of infected from vaccinated recipients. In veterinary medicine, it is also referred to a DIVA vaccine or a SIVA vaccine, referring to the differentiation (or segregation) of infected from vaccinated animals. In practical terms, this is most often achieved by omitting an immunogenic antigen present in the pathogen being vaccinated against, thus creating a negative marker of vaccination. In contrast, vaccination with traditional vaccines containing the complete pathogen, either attenuated or inactivated, precludes the use of serology (e.g. analysis of specific antibodies in body fluids) in epidemiological surveys in vaccinated populations.

Apart from the obvious advantage of allowing continued serological monitoring of vaccinated individuals, cohorts or populations; the serological difference between vaccinated individuals and individuals that were exposed to the pathogen, and were contagious, can be used to continuously monitor the efficacy and safety of the vaccine.

The DIVA strategy has been applied in various countries to successfully eradicate pseudorabies virus from those countries. Swine populations were intensively vaccinated and monitored by the companion diagnostic test and, subsequently, the infected pigs were removed from the population. Bovine herpesvirus 1 DIVA vaccines are also widely used in practice.

== Examples ==
=== Approved ===
- Pseudorabies: the earliest DIVA vaccine-test pairs were created when researchers discovered that some existing pseudorabies vaccine strains carry a deletion in the gE gene. As a result, vaccinated pigs do not develop an antibody against the intact gE while actually infected ones do. This is exploited to make a DIVA test. Novel genetically engineered gE-negative vaccines were constructed to transfer this feature onto more strains.
- Bovine herpesvirus 1: gE is likewise deleted in marker BoHV vaccines to allow for a similar detection scheme. There are also alternative deletion schemes, though in the case of tk it mainly serves to attenuate the virus.

=== In trial ===
- Mycobacterium bovis: the Danish strain of the BCG vaccine is a marker vaccine as it does not elicit immunity against a number of M. bovis antigens (while infections tend to do). This is exploited in the DST-F skin test for cattle, where a fusion protein of three such antigens are used.

=== Unknown ===
- Classical swine fever virus
- Avian influenza
- Actinobacillus pleuropneumonia
- Salmonella in pigs
