= Pseudorabies =

Pseudorabies virus

Virus classification
- (unranked): Virus
- Realm: Duplodnaviria
- Kingdom: Heunggongvirae
- Phylum: Peploviricota
- Class: Herviviricetes
- Order: Herpesvirales
- Family: Orthoherpesviridae
- Genus: Varicellovirus
- Species: Varicellovirus suidalpha1

Synonyms
- Suid alphaherpesvirus 1; Suid herpesvirus 1; Pseudorabies virus

Species of virus

Aujeszky's disease, usually called pseudorabies in the United States, is a viral disease in swine that is endemic in most parts of the world. It is caused by pseudorabies virus, also known as suid herpesvirus 1 (PRV). Aujeszky's disease is considered to be the most economically important viral disease of swine in areas where classical swine fever (hog cholera) has been eradicated. Other mammals, such as cattle, sheep, goats, cats, dogs, and raccoons, are also susceptible. The disease is usually fatal in these animal species. Human infection has been documented.

Research on PRV in pigs has pioneered animal disease control with genetically modified marker vaccines lacking an antigen, which allow for immunological differentiation of infected from vaccinated animals. PRV is now used in model studies of basic processes during lytic herpesvirus infection, and for unravelling molecular mechanisms of herpesvirus neurotropism.

== History ==
Timeline of pseudorabies

Pseudorabies was first reported in 1813 in the US as the cattle disease 'mad itch'. In 1849 pseudorabies was incorrectly reported as rabies in cattle and dogs in Switzerland.

In 1902 the Hungarian veterinarian Aladár Aujeszky demonstrated a new infectious agent in a dog, ox, and cat, and showed it caused the same disease in swine and rabbits. In 1910 J. Schmiedhofer proved it was caused by a virus. R.E. Shope confirmed that 'mad itch' and pseudorabies were caused by the same virus in 1931 and proved that the virus could infect the domestic swine. The virus was classified as a herpesvirus in 1934 by Sabin and Wright.

In the following decades the infection was found in several European countries, especially in cattle, where local intense pruritus (itching) is a characteristic symptom. In the United States, a well known disease in cattle called "mad itch" was concluded to be in fact Aujeszky's disease.

== Disease overview ==
Wild pigs seropositive for pseudorabies in the United States Present Absent

The virus is shed in the saliva and nasal secretions of swine infected by the respiratory route. Aerosolization of the virus and transmission by fomites also may occur. The virus may potentially survive for seven hours in humid air, and it may survive on well water for up to seven hours, in green grass, soil, and feces for up to two days, in contaminated feed for up to three days, and in straw bedding for up to four days.

Diagnosis is made mainly by virus isolation in tissue cultures, or through ELISA or PCR tests. Vaccines are available for swine (ATCvet codes: QI09AA01 (WHO) inactivated, QI09AD01 (WHO) live, plus various combinations). The infection has been eradicated in a number of European countries. In the United States, the domestic swine population in 2004 was declared free of Aujeszky's disease, though the infection still remains in feral pig populations.

Pseudorabies virus is split into two genotypes. The first genotype is prevalent in North America and Europe but has largely been eradicated. The second genotype is prevalent in China.

== Clinical signs ==
Respiratory infection is usually asymptomatic in pigs more than two months old, but it can cause abortion, high mortality in piglets, and coughing, sneezing, fever, constipation, depression, seizures, ataxia, circling, and excess salivation in piglets and mature pigs. Neonatal piglets have nearly 100% mortality, but it is less than 10% in pigs between one and six months of age. Infection in older piglets causes chronic respiratory issues and growth retardation. Pregnant swine can reabsorb their litters or deliver mummified, stillborn, or weakened piglets. In cattle, symptoms include intense itching followed by neurological signs and death. In dogs, symptoms include intense itching, jaw and pharyngeal paralysis, howling, and death. Any infected secondary host generally only lives two to three days.

== Epidemiology ==
Map of the status of pseudorabies in both domestic and feral swine

Populations of wild boar, or feral hogs (Sus scrofa), in the US commonly contract and spread the virus throughout their range. Mortality is highest in young piglets. Pregnant sows often abort when infected. Otherwise healthy male adults (boars) are typically latent carriers, that is, they harbor and transmit the virus without displaying signs or experiencing disability.

Swine (both domestic and feral) are usual reservoirs for this virus, though it does affect other species. Aujeszky's disease has been reported in other mammals, including brown bears, and black bears, Florida panthers, raccoons, coyotes, and whitetail deer. In most cases, contact with pigs or pig products was either known or suspected. Outbreaks in farm fur species in Europe (mink and foxes) have been associated with feeding contaminated pig products. Many other species can be experimentally infected. Racoons may be able to transmit the virus but are not considered relevant for transmission. Evidence of human infection since 2011 has occurred, primarily amongst swine workers in China. Pseudorabies has a high mortality rate in people, No evidence of human–human transmission exists. Pseudorabies can infect most livestock species, cats, dogs, and wild mammals. Infection is typically lethal in non-porcines.

Australia, Canada, Iceland, New Zealand, and parts of the European Union are considered free of pseudorabies. Countries like the USA and Japan are considered free of pseudorabies in domestic swine but not feral swine, and re-infection of domestic swine from these wild vectors is a possibility.

== Prevention ==
Although no specific treatment for acute infection with PRV is available, vaccination can alleviate clinical signs in pigs of certain ages. Typically, mass vaccination of all pigs on the farm with a modified live virus vaccine is recommended. Intranasal vaccination of sows and neonatal piglets one to seven days old, followed by intramuscular (IM) vaccination of all other swine on the premises, helps reduce viral shedding and improve survival. The modified live virus replicates at the site of injection and in regional lymph nodes. Vaccine virus is shed in such low levels, mucous transmission to other animals is minimal. In gene-deleted vaccines, the thymidine kinase gene has also been deleted; thus, the virus cannot infect and replicate in neurons. Breeding herds are recommended to be vaccinated quarterly, and finisher pigs should be vaccinated after levels of maternal antibody decrease. Regular vaccination results in excellent control of the disease. Concurrent antibiotic therapy via feed and IM injection is recommended for controlling secondary bacterial pathogens.

== Applications in neuroscience ==
PRV can be used to analyze neural circuits in the central nervous system (CNS). For this purpose the attenuated (less virulent) Bartha PRV strain is commonly used and is employed as a retrograde and anterograde transneuronal tracer. In the retrograde direction, PRV-Bartha is transported to a neuronal cell body via its axon, where it is replicated and dispersed throughout the cytoplasm and the dendritic tree. PRV-Bartha released at the synapse is able to cross the synapse to infect the axon terminals of synaptically connected neurons, thereby propagating the virus; however, the extent to which non-synaptic transneuronal transport may also occur is uncertain. Using temporal studies and/or genetically engineered strains of PRV-Bartha, second, third, and higher order neurons may be identified in the neural network of interest.

== Economic impact ==
Pseudorabies infections in swine herds can cause serious reproductive loses leading to serious economic impact for affected swine industries.

== See also ==
- Animal viruses
- Virology
