= Aladár Aujeszky =

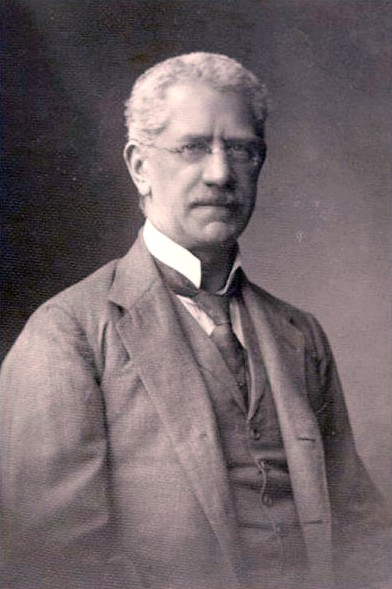
- Born: January 11, 1869; Pest, Hungary
- Died: March 9, 1933 (aged 64); Budapest, Hungary
- Occupation: Veterinary pathologist
- Known for: Work on Pseudorabies

Aladár Aujeszky (11 January 1869 Pest – 9 March 1933 Budapest) was a Hungarian veterinary pathologist, professor of bacteriology and microbiologist, noted for his work on pseudorabies.

Pseudorabies (also known as PRV, Aujeszky's disease, infectious bulbar paralysis, or mad itch), is caused by a virus with icosahedral symmetry and belongs to the subfamily Alphaherpesvirinae within the family Herpesviridae. This subfamily has a wide host range and attacks the peripheral nervous system of the host. It was first described in 1813 in a situation where cattle and pigs shared a stable. In 1909 Weiss found that pigs are the reservoir host of the virus, and that, even though other species such as cattle, sheep, cats, dogs, goats, horses, raccoons, skunks, mice, and rats may transmit the disease, the virus completes its life cycle only in pigs.

Aujeszky studied under Endre Hőgyes. From 1907 to 1933 he worked in the Department of Bacteriology of the Royal Academy of Veterinary Medicine. He was the author of 528 publications and director of the Institute of Microbiology at the Veterinary School in Budapest.
