= Betaarterivirus suid 1 =

Betaarterivirus europensis

Virus classification
- (unranked): Virus
- Realm: Riboviria
- Kingdom: Orthornavirae
- Phylum: Pisuviricota
- Class: Pisoniviricetes
- Order: Nidovirales
- Family: Arteriviridae
- Genus: Betaarterivirus
- Subgenus: Eurpobartevirus
- Species: Betaarterivirus europensis

Synonyms
- Porcine reproductive and respiratory syndrome virus 1; Porcine reproductive and respiratory syndrome virus; Porcine respiratory and reproductive syndrome virus; Swine infertility and respiratory syndrome virus

Species of virus

Porcine reproductive and respiratory syndrome virus (PRRSV), is a virus that causes a disease of pigs, called porcine reproductive and respiratory syndrome (PRRS), also known as blue-ear pig disease (in Chinese, zhū láněr bìng 豬藍耳病). This economically important, panzootic disease causes reproductive failure in breeding stock and respiratory tract illness in young pigs.

== History ==
PRRS earlier known as "mystery swine disease" and "blue ear disease" during 1987–1988 in the United States and Canada caused first undiagnosed outbreaks, characterized by reproductive losses combined with respiratory signs. In 1990-1991, a similar disease was reported in several European countries such as Germany, The Netherlands, Belgium, Denmark, France, the United Kingdom, and Spain. The emergence of PRRS in Japan, Taiwan and mainland China was reported in 1987, 1991 and 1996, respectively.

According to the WOAH, the disease is now present throughout the world, especially in countries with major pig production. Australia, New Zealand, Norway, Sweden and Switzerland are PRRS free.

A better picture of PRRSV's genetic diversity suggested that the virus was present in the field before the "original" outbreaks. The lack of recorded data concerning the prevalence prior to the epidemic was due to unawareness of PRRS.

A hypothesis has been proposed that PRRSV derived of closely related murine lactate dehydrogenase-elevating virus. Phylogeographic analysis of PRRSV epidemiology suggested that the virus diversified into unique subpopulations in Russia and Belarus, approximately 110–140 years ago. However, still there is an uncertainty as to how, when and where the PRRSV emerged.

Several important factors allowed PRRSV to expand further. The transformation of the pig industry worldwide in the 20th century plays a key role. The emergence of high-density confinement management practices and adoption of artificial insemination facilitated wide expansion and diversification of PRRSV. There is abundant evidence that PRRSV is present in wild boars. Wild animals may act as a natural reservoir for PRRSV and could be considered as an additional source of viral infections in domestic pigs.

== Current situation ==
PRRSV is highly dynamic in nature. Increasing genetic diversity allows emergence of severe outbreaks characterized by an elevated abortion rate as well as mortality in growing pigs and sows. This happened in 1996, 2000 and 2007 in the US and in 2006 in China. Highly pathogenic and virulent "atypical" PRRSV isolates are regularly reported in different European countries: Belarus, Belgium, Hungary, Austria and others. Immunization programs of swine herds worldwide with attenuated vaccines made of both PRRSV genotypes provided initially optimistic results in the 1990s.

At present PRRS, is one of the most significant infectious disease affecting the swine industry. It was also named as "pig AIDS" for emerging through accidental transspecies transmission and significant economic losses in worldwide pig production.

== Virology ==
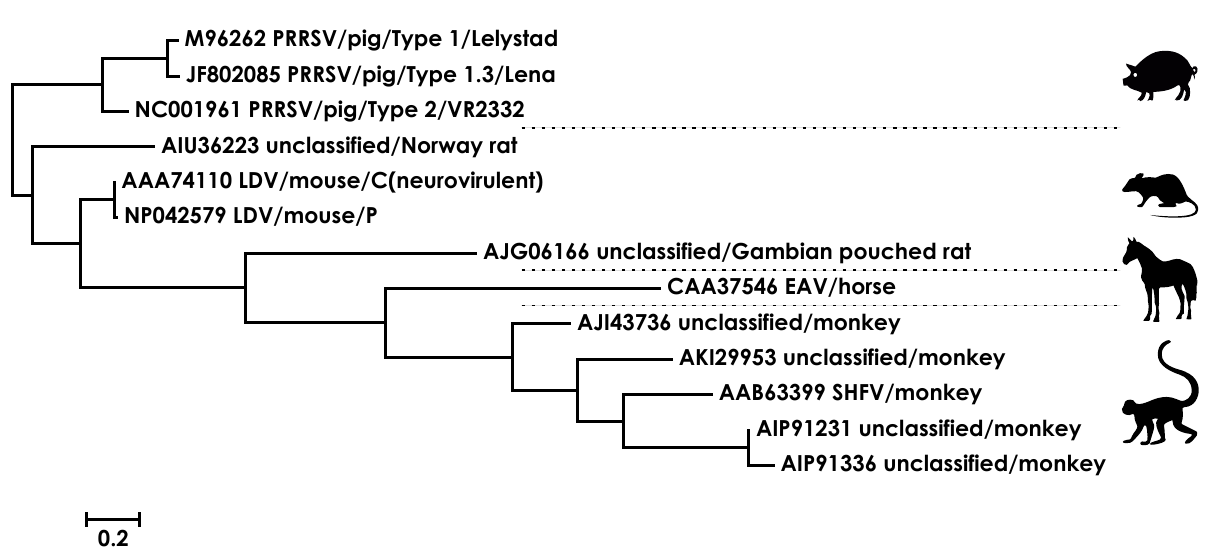
A phylogenetic tree of viruses belonging to the family Arteriviridae

=== Classification ===
PRRSV is a member of the family Arteriviridae, and order Nidovirales. Other members of the family Arteriviridae include: equine arteritis virus (EAV), simian hemorrhagic fever virus (SHFV), wobbly possum disease virus, and lactate dehydrogenase elevating virus (LDV).

=== Structure and genome ===
PRRSV is a small, single-stranded, positive-sense, enveloped RNA virus. The 15 kb genome consists of one linear, single stranded RNA molecule consisting of a 5′ untranslated region (UTR), ten open reading frames (ORFs 1a-1b-2a-2b-3-4-5-5a-6-7) and a 3′ UTR followed by a polyadenylation tail.

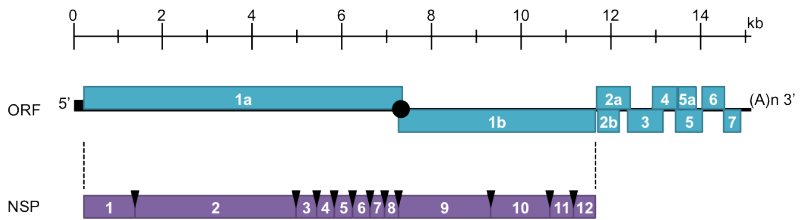
PRRSV genome organization

Two large ORFs (1a and 1b) comprise 75% of the viral genome. They are translated and processed into 14 non-structural proteins including four proteases and the RNA-dependent RNA polymerase.

A PRRSV particle is composed of eight viral structural proteins encoded by ORFs 2-7. They consist of envelope proteins (GP2a, E, GP3, GP4, GP5, ORF5a and M) and the nucleocapsid (N) protein. The most conserved proteins within the whole family of Arteriviridae and PRRSV, in particular, are nsp9 (RNA-dependent RNA polymerase) and nucleocapsid (N) protein. Similarity analysis demonstrates the presence of hyper-variable regions in nsp2 and GP4.

An assembled PRRSV virion appears as a spherical particle with a mean diameter of 56 nm. The particles display a very smooth outline of the lipid bilayer of the envelope with few protruding features represented by the two major envelope protein complexes: M-GP5 and GP2-GP3-GP4. These complexes interact with the well-characterized receptors CD169 (sialoadhesin) and CD163, respectively.

=== Genetic variability ===
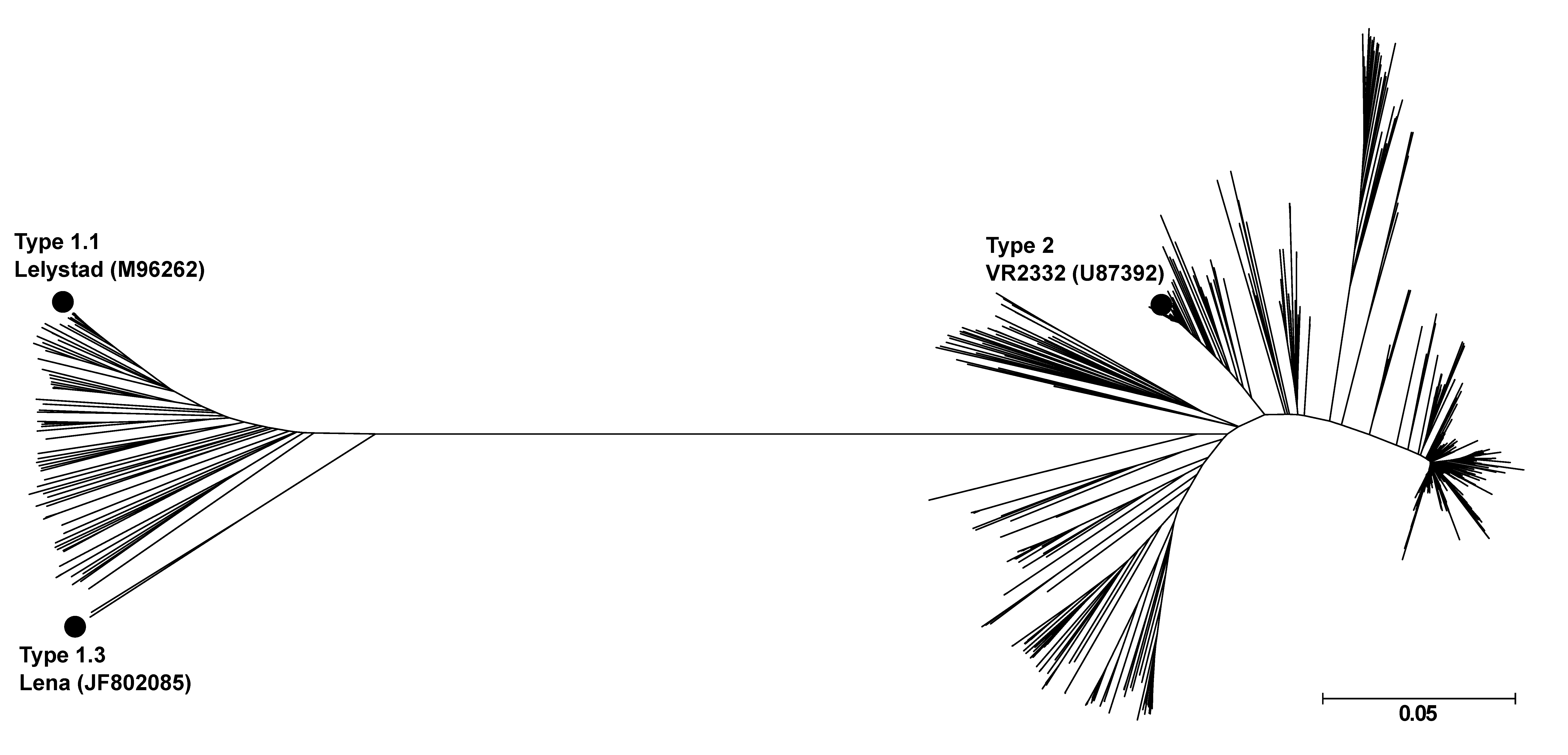
A phylogenetic tree of PRRSV

PRRSV is subdivided in two major types, the European (also known as Type 1) and the North American (also known as type 2). Prototype sequences for each PRRSV type have been defined. For the European PRRSV, this is the Lelystad virus (LV), while for the North American PRRSV, this is the VR-2332. The European and North American PRRSV strains cause similar clinical symptoms, but represent two distinct viral genotypes whose genomes diverge by approximately 40%, thus creating a veil of mystery about the origin of this virus. It was suggested that the emergence of these distant types of PRRSV was a result of two independent evolutionary events. To accommodate the clear divergence of the Type 1 and Type 2 PRRSV, they were split into two separate viruses.

The genetic variation among the viruses isolated from different places increases the difficulty of developing vaccines against it. Similarly, maintaining diagnostic PCR detection assays is difficult due to the high mutation rate of this virus.

In Europe, a geographical demarcation exists between areas of low (Western and Central Europe) and high (Eastern Europe) PRRSV1 diversity. Current genetic classification based on the size of open reading frame (ORF) 7 revealed the existence of three different subtypes within PRRSV1 strains: subtype 1, with Lelystad virus as prototype, is present in Europe and Russia, subtype 2 in Russia and Lithuania and subtype 3 in Belarus. Besides known subtypes, a recent study showed non-subtypeable PRRSV1 isolates.

== Transmission ==
The pattern of PRRSV transmission is mainly via contact and airborne. PRRSV transmission is highly dependent on the route of exposure, virus isolate and the virus dose.

It was shown that pigs could be infected with PRRS virus by several routes of exposure: intranasal, intramuscular, peroral, intrauterine, and vaginal. Pigs are most susceptible to infection via intramuscular inoculation (10^{2.2} tissue culture infectious dose with a 50% endpoint (TCID_{50})), followed by the intranasal route (10^{4.0} TCID_{50}) and peroral route (10^{5.3} TCID_{50}).

Temperature was found to have a great effect on the half-life (T_{1/2}) of infectious PRRSV. Virus is quickly inactivated by heating, drying or by pH extremes. Experiments showed that aerosolized PRRSV was least stable (T_{1/2} = 3.6 min) at 41.0 °C and 73.0% relative humidity and most stable (T_{1/2} = 192.7 min) at 5.0 °C and 17.1% relative humidity.

The basic reproduction number (R_{0}) for Type 1 PRRSV could range from approximately 2 to 5 in naïve pigs. Compared to Type 1 PRRSV isolates, Type 2 PRRSV strains are considered to be of higher virulence.

== Pathogenesis ==
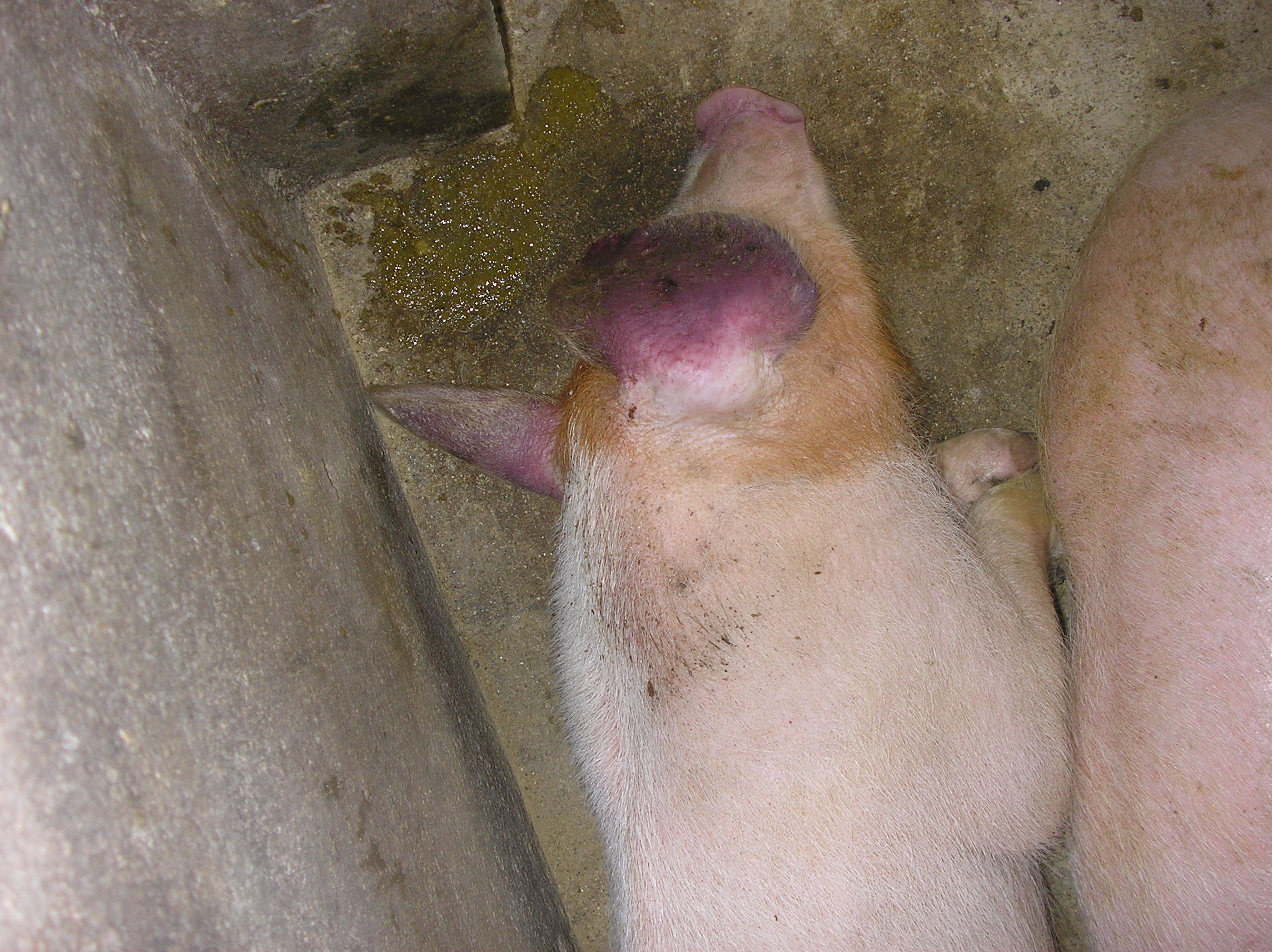
A pig with PRRS

Domesticated pigs and other Suidae are the only known natural hosts of PRRSV. Typical clinical symptoms of PRRS include respiratory disease in piglets and reproductive failure in sows.

Cells of the monocyte/macrophage lineage (macrophages in lungs, lymph nodes, spleen, placenta and other organs, and dendritic cells) are the primary targets for viral replication in vivo. Replication cycle begins with the interaction between the GP5-M complex of PRRSV and the cellular receptors heparan sulfate and CD169 (sialoadhesin). Upon binding and internalization, GP2-GP3-GP4 interacts with CD163 mediating the disassembly and release of the nucleocapsid.

PRRSV infection starts with an acute infection during which tonsils and lungs serve as preferential sites of infection leading to respiratory problems in young pigs. The first stage of infection results in a cell-free viremia starting from 6–12 h post infection and lasting for several weeks despite the induction of circulating antibodies. Subsequently, depending on the immune status of the pigs, the acute infection may be continued with a persistent stage with viral replication localized in lymphoid organs, including tonsils, spleen and lymph nodes. At the final stage of infection, PRRSV replication gradually declines until the virus becomes eliminated in the host. However, the virus may persist in pigs for a longer period of time. The mechanism of persistence may be based on the high mutation rate of the PRRSV RNA genome allowing an escape from the host immune surveillance.

After an extensive viremia, the virus reaches macrophages in different internal organs (e.g. lymphoid tissues and maternal endometrium) resulting in disorders, such as reproductive failure in sows. At a late stage of gestation, PRRSV can cross the placental barrier and infect fetuses. Depending on the viral strain and immune status of the host, PRRSV may cause both subclinical and severe reproductive and/or respiratory disease. PRRSV can suppress the host immune defense system, which allows the establishment of secondary infections.

The clinical outcome of a PRRSV infection can be aggravated by co-infections with other pathogens. It is characterized by problems with growth performance and clinical signs such as fever, cough, anorexia and dyspnea. Along with PRRSV, porcine circovirus type 2 (PCV2), Pasteurella multocida and porcine mycoplasmas are the most frequently detected pathogens in porcine respiratory disease complex affected pigs. PRRSV infection may also decrease the efficacy of vaccines used in pigs. Due to these problems, PRRS is considered worldwide as a serious threat for the pig industry.

The designation of the term "high pathogenicity" tends to be relative. In general, the highly pathogenic PRRS shows higher reproductive failure rate in pregnant sows, high morbidity and high mortality in pigs of all ages. Infected pigs display a range of respiratory (dyspnea, sneezing, coughing) and systemic clinical signs (a long-lasting high fever of over +41 °C, depression, anorexia, discoloration of the skin and the ears), conjunctivitis. Neurological signs could be seen in some cases. The common lesions at necropsy may include inflammation of lungs and lymph nodes, fibrinous pleuropneumonia and pericarditis, peritonitis.

== Control ==
=== Laboratory diagnosis ===
Laboratory-based diagnostic tests have evolved significantly since initial discovery of the PRRS virus in the late 1980s. Initially viral culture was used to confirm PRRSV in serum or tissue samples. This process involves growing the virus in-vitro on cell lines over a period of 3–14 days or longer. If cytopathic effect is observed during culture, the culture is confirmed as the PRRS virus by direct fluorescent antibody or other confirmation method prior to reporting the sample as positive for presence of PRRSV.

In the late 1990s, nested PCR was used to the detect the virus as it showed improved sensitivity over non-nested PCR. Now, quantitative PCR assays offered as-good or better sensitivity than nested PCR, fast turnaround time in the lab, and lower rates of cross-contamination via closed-tube amplification.

=== Management strategies to control PRRS ===
A variety of management strategies have been proposed to control and eliminate PRRSV:

- gilt acclimatization,
- isowean (isolated weaning),
- herd stabilization,
- total and partial depopulation/repopulation,
- test and removal,
- herd closure and rollover,
- mass vaccination with unidirectional pig flow and herd closure,
- McRebel (Management Changes to Reduce Exposure to Bacteria to Eliminate Losses),
- semen quality monitoring,
- regional elimination program.
- feedback

=== Immunization of animals ===
Active immunization is currently the only widely available way of PRRS control in swine herds worldwide. For specific immunization of animals against PRRS, several types of vaccines and live virus inoculation are used.

The first PRRSV2 live vaccine, Ingelvac PRRS MLV (Boehringer Ingelheim Vetmedica, Inc.), is available for prevention and control of PRRS since 1994. It was obtained by continuous passages in MARC-145 cells. To date, a number of commercial PRRS vaccines have been successfully employed in the global market. The great genetic diversity of PRRSV and the absence of clear immunological parameters correlating with the protection are substantial barriers to new PRRS vaccine development.

Pigs resistant to PRRS have been engineered using gene editing technologies by the biotechnology company Genus.

== See also ==
- Porcine reproductive and respiratory syndrome virus 2
- Porcine epidemic diarrhoea
- Animal viruses
- Virology
