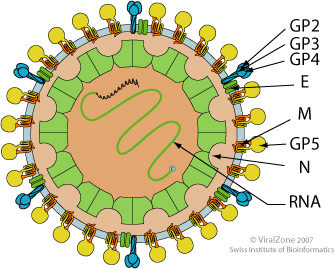
- Arterivirus virion
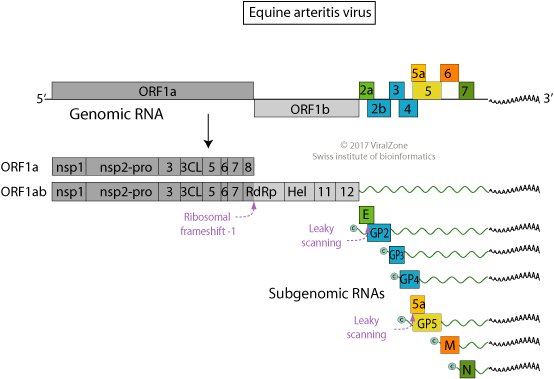
- Equine artevirus genome

Virus classification
- (unranked): Virus
- Realm: Riboviria
- Kingdom: Orthornavirae
- Phylum: Pisuviricota
- Class: Pisoniviricetes
- Order: Nidovirales
- Suborder: Arnidovirineae
- Family: Arteriviridae

= Arteriviridae =

Family of viruses in the suborder Arnidovirineae

Arteriviridae is a family of enveloped, positive-strand RNA viruses in the order Nidovirales which infect vertebrates. Host organisms include equids, pigs, possums, nonhuman primates, and rodents. The family includes, for example, equine arteritis virus in horses which causes mild-to-severe respiratory disease and reproductive failure, porcine reproductive and respiratory syndrome virus type 1 and type 2 in pigs which causes a similar disease, simian hemorrhagic fever virus which causes a highly lethal fever, lactate dehydrogenase–elevating virus which affects mice, and wobbly possum disease virus.

== Structure ==
Member viruses are enveloped, spherical, and 45–60 nm in diameter.

== Genome ==
Arteriviruses have a positive-sense single-stranded RNA genome.

== Taxonomy ==
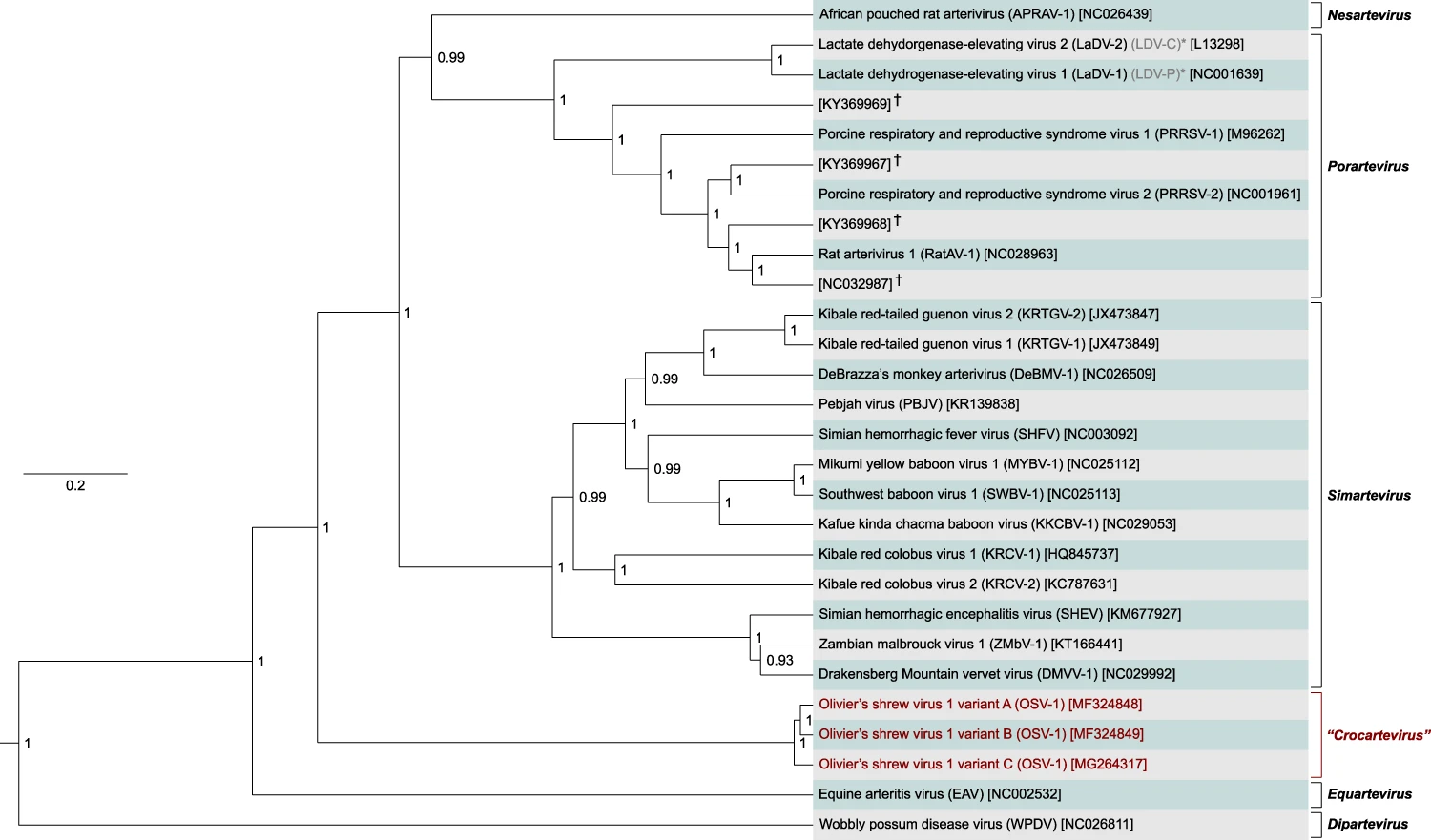
Phylogenetic tree of arteriviruses

The family contains six subfamilies that contain 13 genera. This taxonomy is shown hereafter (-virinae denotes subfamily and -virus denotes genus):

- Crocarterivirinae
  - Muarterivirus
- Equarterivirinae
  - Alphaarterivirus
- Heroarterivirinae
  - Lambdaarterivirus
- Simarterivirinae
  - Deltaarterivirus
  - Epsilonarterivirus
  - Etaarterivirus
  - Iotaarterivirus
  - Thetaarterivirus
  - Zetaarterivirus
- Variarterivirinae
  - Betaarterivirus
  - Gammaarterivirus
  - Nuarterivirus
- Zealarterivirinae
  - Kappaarterivirus
