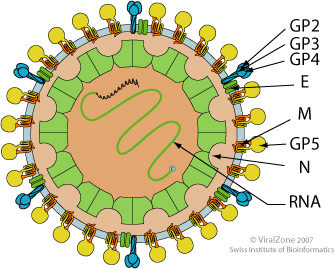
- Structure of a virus in the Arterviridae family

Virus classification
- (unranked): Virus
- Realm: Riboviria
- Kingdom: Orthornavirae
- Phylum: Pisuviricota
- Class: Pisoniviricetes
- Order: Nidovirales
- Suborder: Arnidovirineae

= Arnidovirineae =

Suborder of viruses

Arnidovirineae is a suborder of viruses in the order Nidovirales. There are 4 families in the Arnidovirineae suborder.

== Hosts ==
For species that fall under the Arnidovirineae suborder, large mammals serve as natural hosts, with sizes varying from mice to boars and horses. However, for three genera, snakes and turtles serve as natural hosts.

== Genome ==
Viruses in this suborder have relatively small genomes compared to other suborders in the Nidovirales order, ranging from 12-16kb. These genome differences are the primary identifying factor of the suborder. Species of Arnidovirneae have been found all around the world.

== Taxonomy ==
The suborder contains the following families:

- Arteriviridae
- Cremegaviridae
- Gresnaviridae
- Olifoviridae
