= Wobbly Possum Disease =

Disease of the brushtail possum

Wobbly Possum Disease is a fatal neurological condition of the brushtail possum (Trichosurus vulpecula), first reported in 1995. Symptoms include a stumbling gait, tremors, blindness, activity during the daytime, and falling from trees. The disease is believed to be caused by a virus.
