= Classical swine fever =

Classical swine fever virus

Virus classification
- (unranked): Virus
- Realm: Riboviria
- Kingdom: Orthornavirae
- Phylum: Kitrinoviricota
- Class: Flasuviricetes
- Order: Amarillovirales
- Family: Pestiviridae
- Genus: Orthopestivirus
- Species: Orthopestivirus suis

Synonyms
- Classical swine fever virus; Hog cholera virus; Hog cholera (European swine fever) virus; Pestivirus suis

Viral disease of swine

Classical swine fever (CSF) or hog cholera (also sometimes called pig plague based on the German word Schweinepest) is a highly contagious disease of swine (Old World and New World pigs). It has been mentioned as a potential bioweapon.

== Clinical signs ==
Classical swine fever causes fever, skin lesions, convulsions and splenic infarctions; in acute-lethal cases, death usually occurs two to four weeks after infection, and mortality can reach 100% depending on the age of the animal and the virulence of the virus strain.

The disease has an acute, a chronic and a persistent form, and can range from severe, with high mortality, to mild or even unapparent.

In the acute form of the disease, in all age groups, there is fever, huddling of sick animals, loss of appetite, dullness, weakness, conjunctivitis, constipation followed by diarrhoea, and an unsteady gait. Several days after the onset of clinical signs, the ears, abdomen and inner thighs may show a purple discoloration. Animals with acute disease die within 1–2 weeks. Severe cases of the disease appear very similar to African swine fever. With low-virulence strains, the only expression may be poor reproductive performance and the birth of piglets with neurologic defects such as congenital tremor.

== Immunization ==
A small fraction of the infected pigs may survive and are rendered immune. Artificial immunization procedures were first developed by Marion Dorset.

== Epidemiology ==
The disease is endemic in much of Asia, Central and South America, and parts of Europe and Africa. It was believed to have been eradicated in the United Kingdom by 1966 (according to the Department for Environment, Food and Rural Affairs), but an outbreak occurred in East Anglia in 2000. On January 31, 1978 USDA Secretary Bob Bergland declared that the United States was free of the disease. The appearance of CSF in Italy and Spain was traced by in a retroactive genetic analysis. Greiser-Wilke et al., 2000 traced these to shipments of piglets from the Netherlands.

Other regions believed free of CSF include Australia, Belgium (1998), Canada (1962), Ireland, New Zealand, and Scandinavia.

== Virus ==
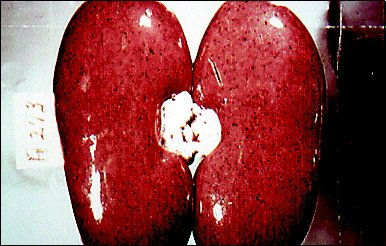
Pinpoint hemorrhages on the kidneys are characteristic of classical swine fever.

The infectious agent responsible is a virus CSFV (previously called hog cholera virus) of the genus Orthopestivirus in the family Pestiviridae. CSFV is closely related to the ruminant orthopestiviruses that cause bovine viral diarrhoea and border disease.

The effect of different CSFV strains varies widely, leading to a wide range of clinical signs. Highly virulent strains correlate with acute, obvious disease and high mortality, including neurological signs and hemorrhages within the skin.

Less virulent strains can give rise to subacute or chronic infections that may escape detection, while still causing abortions and stillbirths. In these cases, herds in high-risk areas are usually serologically tested on a thorough statistical basis.

Infected piglets born to infected but subclinical sows help maintain the disease within a population. Other signs can include lethargy, fever, immunosuppression, chronic diarrhoea, and secondary respiratory infections. The incubation period of CSF ranges from 2 to 14 days, but clinical signs may not be apparent until after 2 to 3 weeks. Preventive state regulations usually assume 21 days as the outside limit of the incubation period. Animals with an acute infection can survive 2 to 3 months before their eventual death.

Eradicating CSF is problematic. Current programmes revolve around rapid detection, diagnosis, and slaughter. This may possibly be followed by emergency vaccination (ATCvet codes: QI09AA06 (WHO) for the inactivated viral vaccine, QI09AD04 (WHO) for the live vaccine). Vaccination is only used where the virus is widespread in the domestic pig population and/or in wild or feral pigs. In the latter case, a slaughter policy alone is usually impracticable. Instead, countries within the EU have implemented hunting restrictions designed to limit the movement of infected boars, as well as using marker and emergency vaccines to inhibit the spread of infection. Possible sources for maintaining and introducing infection include the wide transport of pigs and pork products, as well as endemic CSF within wild boar and feral pig populations.

== Strains ==
- 1 – including 1.1, 1.2, 1.3, 1.4, the unassigned 1.x
- 2 – including 2.1, 2.2, 2.3
- 3 – including 3.1, 3.2, 3.3, 3.4

== Diagnosis ==
=== Standard diagnostic tests include ===
- Fluorescent antibody test (FAT) – detection of viral protein using fluorescent labelled antibodies in tissue
- Serum Enzyme-linked-immunosorbent assay (ELISA) – detection of host animal antibody response in serum samples.
- Antigen ELISA – detection of viral protein (antigen) in serum samples.
- RT-qPCR test – detection of viral RNA in samples, especially useful to differentiate strains. Direct genetic typing for CSF was first developed by Greiser-Wilke et al., 2000 to trace descendants of the 1997-1998 EU epizootic.
- Virus isolation – isolation of virus in cell culture.

=== Histopathological examination ===
- Histology of the brain shows vasculoendothelial proliferation and perivascular cuffing (cuffing is highly suggestive when accompanied by other signs, but is not pathognomonic for the disease).

== See also ==
- 2007 Central Luzon hog cholera outbreak
- Animal viruses
