= Lactate dehydrogenase elevating virus =

Gammaarterivirus lacdeh

Virus classification
- (unranked): Virus
- Realm: Riboviria
- Kingdom: Orthornavirae
- Phylum: Pisuviricota
- Class: Pisoniviricetes
- Order: Nidovirales
- Family: Arteriviridae
- Genus: Gammaarterivirus
- Species: Gammaarterivirus lacdeh

Synonyms
- Lactate dehydrogenase elevating virus (LDV)

Species of virus

Lactate dehydrogenase elevating virus (LDV) constitutes the species Gamamaarterivirus lacdeh which is part of the family Arteriviridae and order Nidovirales. The order Nidovirales also includes the family of coronaviruses. Arteriviruses infect macrophages in animals and cause a variety of diseases. LDV specifically causes lifelong persistent viremia in mice, but does not harm the host and only slightly harms the immune system. The main clinical sign is an increased level of the plasma enzyme lactate dehydrogenase (LDH). LDV has a remarkably narrow cell type specificity, meaning nothing homologous with LDV in mice has been found in another species.

== Discovery ==
LDV was discovered in 1960 by Dr. Vernon Riley and his colleagues while they were working with plasma enzymes in tumor-bearing mice. They found that many types of transplantable tumors caused a five to tenfold increase in the plasma lactate dehydrogenase (LDH) activity within three days of the transplantation. This occurred even before the tumors were obvious clinically. In further investigations, they found that cell-free plasma from tumor-bearing mice was sufficient to cause this increase, which indicated that the agent was small, and further investigation showed that it was a virus.

== Transmission ==
Because the virus causes persistent viremia, virus in the bloodstream, it can be spread by blood-sucking ectoparasites. This is the theory for spread of virus in feral or wild mice which have been found to be infected in Europe, America, and Australia. Another method of transmission is from the mother to her fetus during pregnancy; however, this mode is much less likely in a chronically infected mother mouse. The mother can also spread the virus to her young through her milk. Studies with male mice have shown that they seldom transmit the virus; however, when an infected male fathers a litter with an uninfected female, there are more females in the litter than would be expected, and none of them are infected. However, this is controversial; some believe that it can be spread thought sexual contact. Other modes include fighting and cannibalism.

== Structure ==
LDV has a genome that consists of single stranded positive sense RNA that is 14.1kb long. The genome is dominated by two large open reading frames, ORF1a and ORF1ab; these code for two polyproteins, PP1a and PP1ab. These polyproteins are thought to be cleaved into 12 products. The virus contains a nucleocapsid that is spherical with a diameter of 35 ± 4 nm. This is then enclosed in an envelope to create a smooth surface. The envelope consists of two proteins, VP2 and VP3. VP2 has a molecular weight of 18,000, and VP3 is a heterogeneous glycoprotein of molecular weight 15,000. The envelope is extremely labile and tends to slough off; this characteristic is indicated by its extreme sensitivity to detergent treatment. The virus has a density of 1.13g/mL and the nucleocapsid has a density of 1.17g/mL in a sucrose density gradient. LDV has been shown to mature by budding through the intracytoplasmic membrane. The virions have four structural proteins which include a nucleocapsid protein, a non-glycosylated envelope protein, a major envelope glycoprotein, and a minor envelope glycoprotein.

== Pathogenesis ==
As mentioned before, LDV has a very high specificity. Studies have shown that LDV is not only host specific, but cell specific as well. The first cells it was shown to replicate in were primary mouse embryo cell cultures, but these cultures had to be freshly explanted. After about seven days the cells lost their ability to support LDV even though they could support other viruses. When other mouse tissues were tested it was found that peritoneal macrophages consistently yielded the highest virus titers. Further studies have shown that in the first twenty-four hours after infection of a macrophage there is very rapid virus replication; this rate gradually falls off to a very low level but continues as long as the macrophage continues to divide. The viremia arises because LDV lyses the cell after replication. The virus is most commonly found in the liver, spleen, lymph nodes, and skin. The main effect of the virus on the host cell is to increase the activity of certain plasma enzymes; this increase in activity is not directly related to the level of viral infectivity, but does depend on the balance between rate of entry and rate of clearance and evidence leans more heavily towards the rate of clearance. In the plasma, LDH consists of five isoenzymes and LDV generally only has an effect on LDH A4. Another effect only occurs in the C58 and AKR type mice and involves destruction of lower motor neurons producing age-dependent polioencephalomyelitis. Other effects of the virus include a temporary fall in the total white blood cell count that lasts for twenty-four hours after infection.
