= Simian hemorrhagic fever virus =

Virus classification
- (unranked): Virus
- Realm: Riboviria
- Kingdom: Orthornavirae
- Phylum: Pisuviricota
- Class: Pisoniviricetes
- Order: Nidovirales
- Family: Arteriviridae
- Genus: Deltaarterivirus
- Subgenus: Hedartevirus
- Species: Deltaarterivirus hemfev

Synonyms
- Simian haemorrhagic fever virus

Species of virus

Simian hemorrhagic fever virus or simian haemorrhagic fever virus (SHFV), is a highly pathogenic virus in monkeys. It is a positive-stranded RNA virus classified in the family Arteriviridae. It is the only member of the subgenus Hedartevirus.

== History ==
SHFV was first identified and isolated in 1964 as the causative agent of hemorrhagic fever outbreaks associated with high mortality in macaque colonies in the United States and the Soviet Union. During these outbreaks, macaques were acquired from the same region of India and housed with African origin primates including patas monkeys, baboons, and African green monkeys. The outbreak wiped out all of the macaques in the Soviet Union lab Scientists utilizing the same needles to test diseases such as tuberculosis in monkey models are thought to have been transmission from other animals to non-human primates like macaques causing the outbreak in the United States.

More recently, the virus has been seen and identified in a variety of natural hosts such as baboons and African green, patas, guenons and colobus monkeys. In 2022, scientists cautioned about potential future spillover of SHFV due to the virus in trials being able to enter and replicate in human monocytes, indicating full functionality required for viral replication are present in human cells.

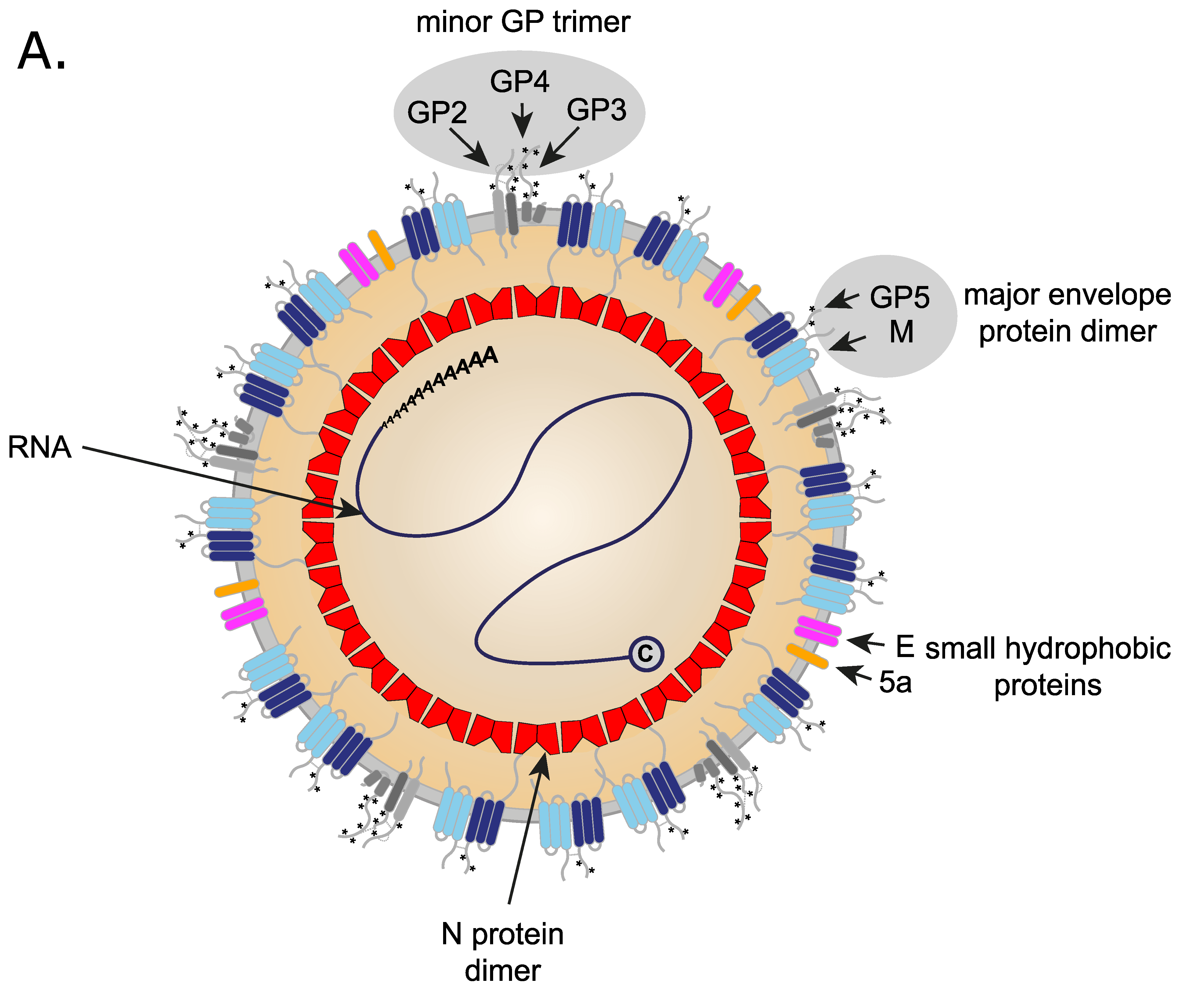
General viral structure of viruses in the family Arteriviridae.

== Hosts and Transmission ==
In general, African monkeys such as baboons, African green, guenons and colobus monkeys, are natural hosts of SHFV that have persistent infections resulting in asymptomatic infections. Patas are believed to be the natural host for the virus since about 50% of wild patas monkeys have antibodies for the virus. Recently, red colobus monkeys and red-tailed guenons have been identified as natural hosts for SHFV. Transmission occurs via direct contact of animals and accidental inoculation with tissue fluids, usually during fighting, aerosolized droplets of infected animals, and fomites. In macaques, however, infection with this virus can result in acute severe disease with high mortality. Isolates from persistently infected, asymptomatic baboons can induce an effective disease and outbreak in macaque populations.

== Diagnosis and Detection ==
Diagnosis starts by looking for common symptoms present in monkeys including fever and edema. One can also take blood and serum samples and analyze them for the presence of viral genetic materials such as viral genomic RNA or viral mRNAs by utilizing reverse transcriptase polymerase chain reaction (RT-PCR). Additionally, other laboratory assays include indirect immunofluorescence assays or the newer, less time consuming enzyme-linked immunosorbent assay (ELISA) that are effective for testing for the presence viral antigens. More work is needed to develop faster assays for better detection.

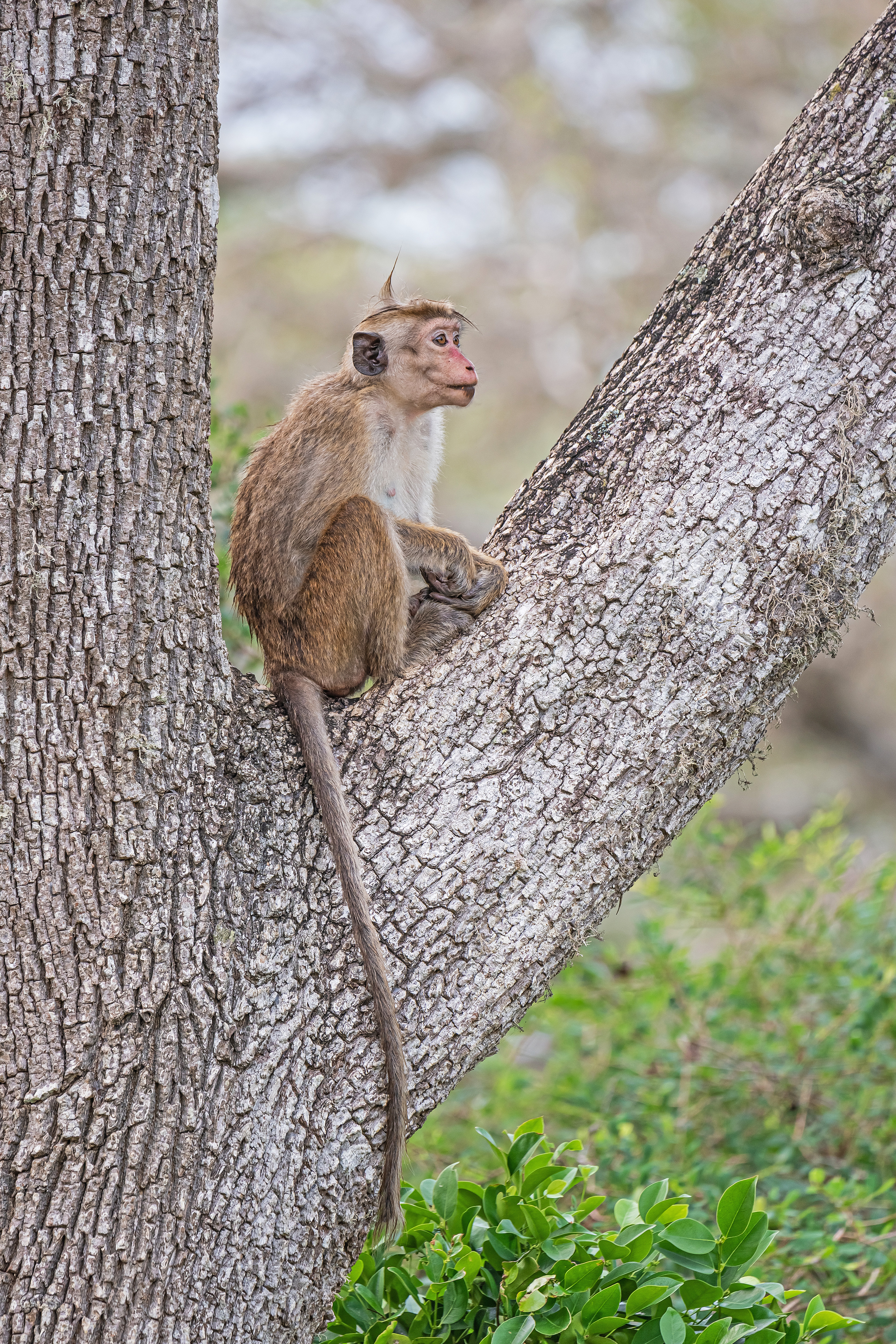
Simian Hemorrhagic Fever Virus can cause significant mortality in Macaque colonies.

== Symptoms, Disease, and Impact ==
SHFV, like other viruses in the family Arteriviridae, targets and replicates macrophages and dendritic cells in their hosts. Asymptomatic infection of the virus can occur in patas monkeys, vervet monkeys, and baboons, although it is observed primarily in patas monkeys. For symptomatic infection in non-natural hosts, infection has a rapid onset with animals developing a high fever, dehydration, facial edema, cyanosis, anorexia, melena, and may begin to hemorrhage at the cutaneous, subcutaneous, and retrobulbar levels. Lesions occur characteristically in lymphoid tissue characteristic as well as the spleen, gastrointestinal tract, and kidneys. Thrombocytopenia will develop soon after. Death usually occurs within 10–15 days after symptoms appear and can wipe out whole colonies due to rapid spread.

== Genome, Protein Production, and Replication ==
=== Genome ===
SHFV genomes are positive-sense, single-stranded, polycistronic RNAs with a 5′ cap and a 3′ poly-A tract. SHFV has one of the longest genomes in the Arteriviridae family. They encode 16 non-structural proteins and 12 structural proteins. Additionally, they encode 4 unique extra structural proteins found only in simian viruses in the Arteriviridae family The genome organization and replication strategies of SHFV are similar to those of coronaviruses with major differences in structural protein compositions and capsid types. Additionally, SHFV encodes more proteins near the ends of its genomes compared to other members in the Arteriviridae family.

=== Protein Production ===
To produce non-structural proteins (nsp) for viral protein production and replication, the first two-thirds of the SHFV genome encode two long polyproteins, polyprotein 1a and polyprotein 1ab. Polyprotein 1ab is produced due to ribosomal slipping near the polyprotein 1a stop codon. The polyproteins are translated into proteins involved in genome replication and transcription of sgRNAs. Unique to SHFV, they contain a longer nsp1 protein that encodes viral papain-like protease 1 (PLP1) that helps cleave other proteins from the long polyprotein. Nsp1 proteins also interfere with host signaling pathways that allows for better viral replication.

To produce structural proteins for capsid production, the last third of the SHFV genome near the 3' end encodes the structural proteins for the capsid. SHFV have a spherical nucleocapsid composed of interacting nucleocapsid (N) protein dimers. The capsid is surrounded by an envelope.

== Invasion and Exit of Cell ==
To enter a host cell, SHFV relies on a clathrin-mediated endocytosis-like pathway to be uptaken. SHFV relies on utilizing membrane receptors, CD163, and requires low pH to be endocytosed into the cell. After invasion of the cell, SHFV replicates much like other positive sense RNA viruses such as coronaviruses.

When ready to exit a cell, SHFV will bud into a membranous organelle like a golgi body or endoplasmic reticulum. They then steal the envelope of the organelle for their own capsid, traverse the cell via the secretory pathway, and then leave the cell as an enveloped virus via exocytosis.
