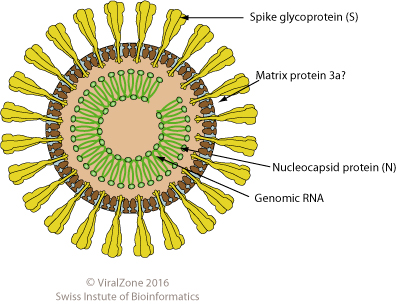
- Viruses of the closely related suborder Mesnidovirineae, family Mesoniviridae

Virus classification
- (unranked): Virus
- Realm: Riboviria
- Kingdom: Orthornavirae
- Phylum: Pisuviricota
- Class: Pisoniviricetes
- Order: Nidovirales
- Suborder: Nanidovirineae

= Nanidovirineae =

Suborder of viruses

Nanidovirineae is a suborder of viruses in the order Nidovirales.

== Hosts ==
Ghost sharks and the halfbeak Hyporhamphus sajori serve as natural hosts for species in the suborder. Nanidovirineae where found infecting these fishes only in China. Nanidovirineae is distinguished from the other orders in Nidovirales mainly by this reliance on fish hosts, although Tobaniviridae also have some fish as natural hosts.

== Taxonomy ==
The suborder contains the following families:

- Nanghoshaviridae
- Nanhypoviridae
