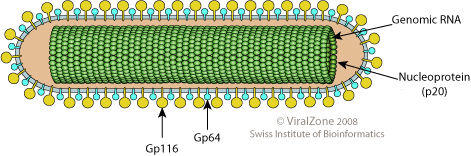
- Roniviridae virion
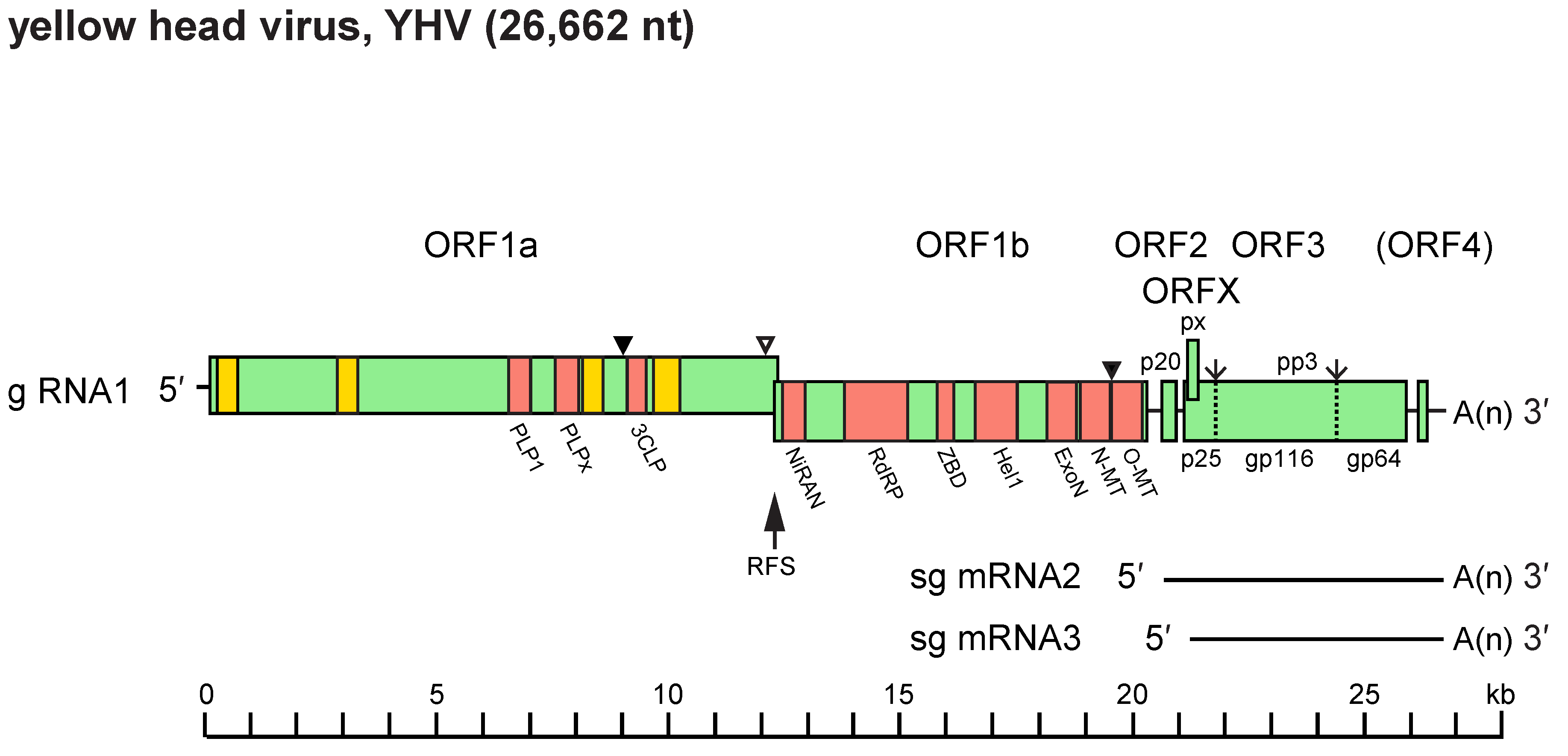
- Yellow head virus genome

Virus classification
- (unranked): Virus
- Realm: Riboviria
- Kingdom: Orthornavirae
- Phylum: Pisuviricota
- Class: Pisoniviricetes
- Order: Nidovirales
- Suborder: Ronidovirineae

= Ronidovirineae =

Suborder of viruses

Ronidovirineae is a suborder of enveloped positive-strand RNA viruses in the order Nidovirales which infect arthropods. Host organisms include crustaceans such as shrimp.

== Taxonomy ==
The suborder has two families that contain one subfamily and two genera each:

- Euroniviridae
  - Ceronivirinae
    - Charybnivirus
    - Paguronivirus
- Roniviridae
  - Okanivirinae
    - Nimanivirus
    - Okavirus

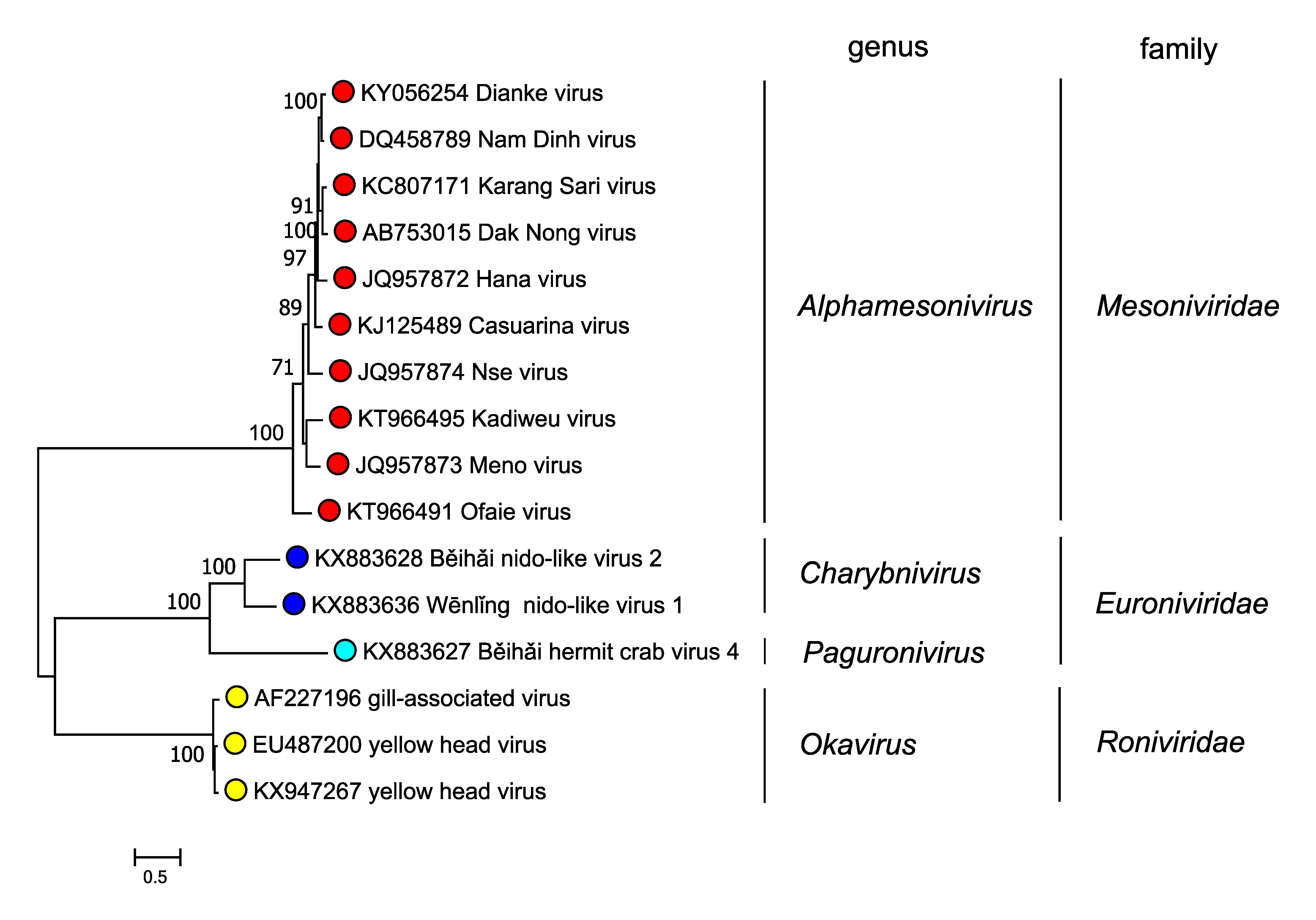
Phylogenetic tree of Ronidovirineae
