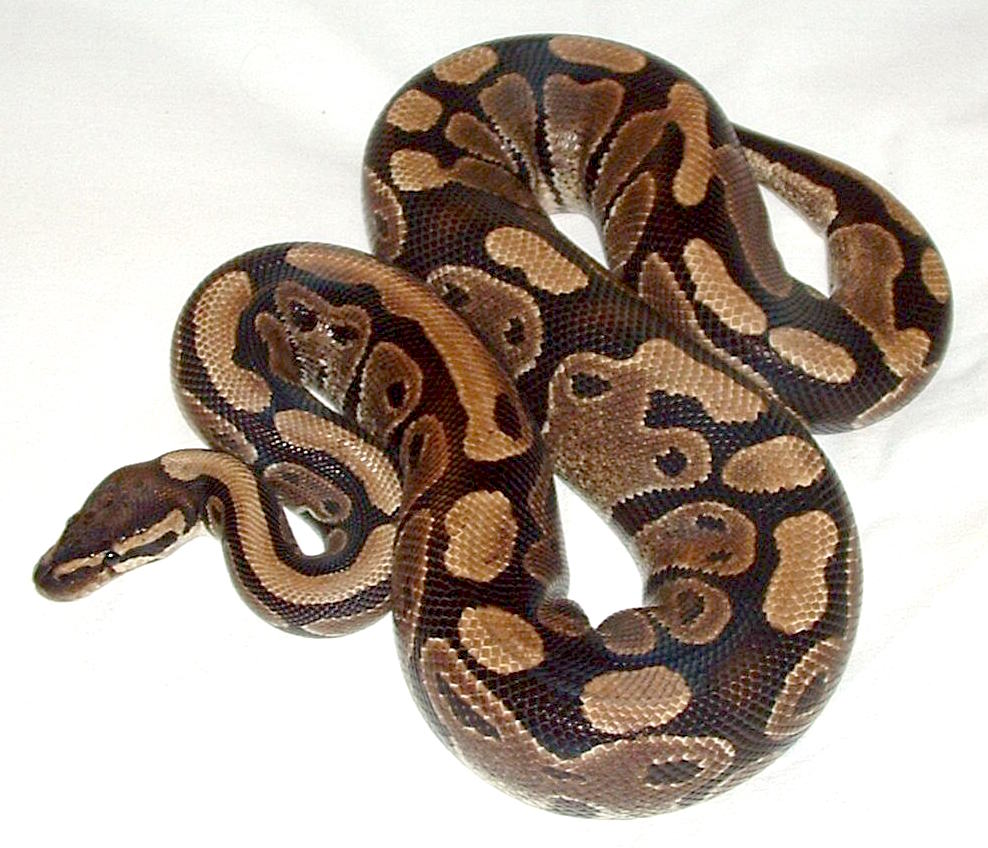

Conservation status
- Near Threatened (IUCN 3.1)
- CITES Appendix II

Scientific classification
- Kingdom: Animalia
- Phylum: Chordata
- Class: Reptilia
- Order: Squamata
- Suborder: Serpentes
- Family: Pythonidae
- Genus: Python
- Species: P. regius

Binomial name
- Python regius (Shaw, 1802)
- Distribution map of ball python

Synonyms
- Boa regia Shaw, 1802; Engyius (regia) Wagler, 1842; Cenchris regia Gray, 1831; Python bellii Gray, 1842; Hortulia regia Gray, 1849

= Ball python =

Species of constricting snake

The ball python (Python regius), also called the royal python, is a python species native to West and Central Africa, where it lives in grasslands, shrublands and open forests. This nonvenomous constrictor is the smallest of the African pythons, growing to a maximum length of 182 cm (72 in). The name "ball python" refers to its tendency to curl into a ball when stressed or frightened.

== Taxonomy ==
The specific name regius is a Latin adjective meaning "royal". In 1735 Albertus Seba described a specimen of Python regius, brought from the coast of Mozambique, as Serpens Phyticus; Africanus, prodigiofus, ab indigenis divino honore cullus. Based on Seba's work, George Shaw proposed the scientific name Boa regia in 1802. The generic name Python was proposed by François Marie Daudin in 1803 for non-venomous flecked snakes. In 1844, André Marie Constant Duméril and Gabriel Bibron placed the species in the genus Python.

== Description ==
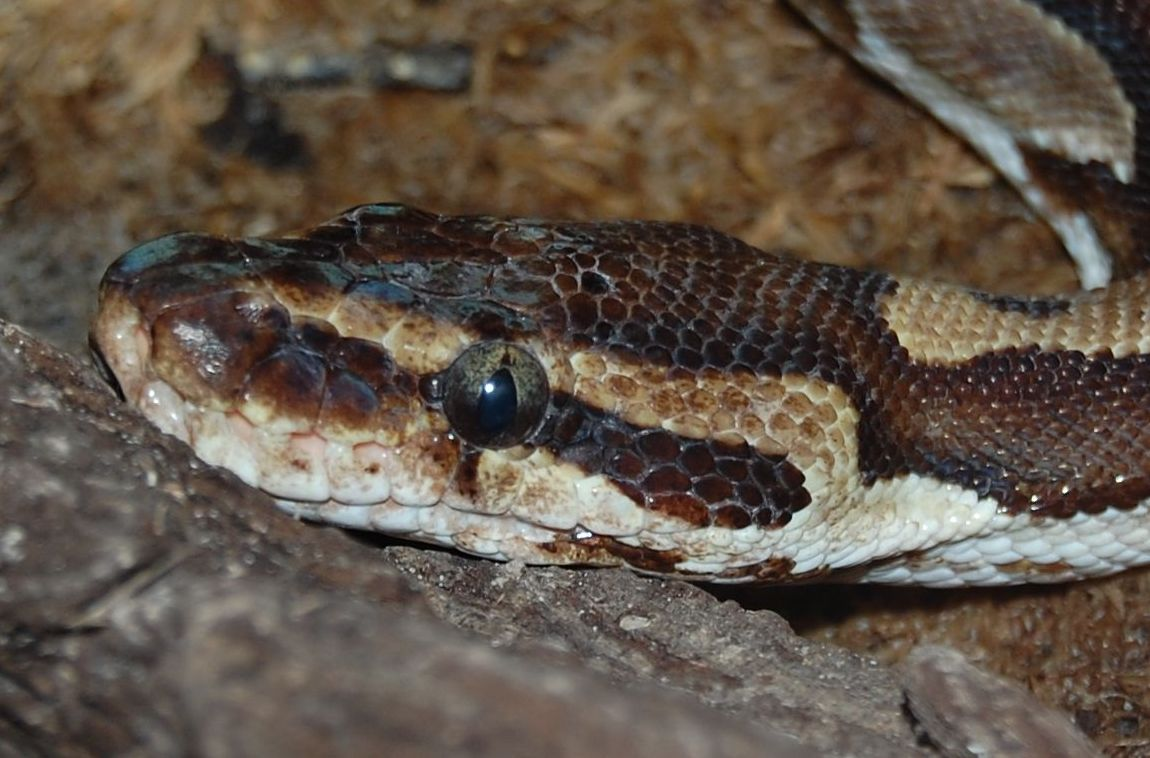
Close-up of head

The ball python is dark brown with light brown blotches on the back and sides. Its white or cream belly is scattered with black markings. It is a stocky snake with a relatively small head and smooth scales. It reaches a maximum adult length of 182 cm (72 in). Females reach an average snout-to-vent length of 116.2 cm (45.7 in), a 44.3 mm (1.74 in) long jaw, an 8.7 cm (3.4 in) long tail and a maximum weight of 1.635 kg (3.60 lb). Males are smaller with an average snout-to-vent length of 111.3 cm (43.8 in), a 43.6 mm (1.72 in) long jaw, a 8.6 cm (3.4 in) long tail and a maximum weight of 1.561 kg (3.44 lb). Both sexes have pelvic spurs on both sides of the vent. During copulation, males use these spurs for gripping females. Males tend to have larger spurs, and sex is best determined by manual eversion of the male hemipenes or inserting a probe into the cloaca to check the presence of an inverted hemipenis.

== Distribution and habitat ==
The ball python is native to west Sub Saharan Africa, from Senegal through Cameroon to Sudan and Uganda. It prefers grasslands, savannas, and sparsely wooded areas.

== Behavior and ecology ==
Ball pythons are typically nocturnal or crepuscular, meaning that they are active during dusk, dawn, and/or nighttime. This species is known for its defense strategy that involves coiling into a tight ball when threatened, with its head and neck tucked away in the middle. This defense behavior is typically employed in lieu of biting, which makes this species easy for humans to handle and has contributed to their popularity as a pet.

In the wild, ball pythons favor mammal burrows and other underground hiding places, where they also aestivate. Males tend to display more semi-arboreal behaviors, whilst females tend towards terrestrial behaviors.

=== Diet ===
The diet of the ball python in the wild consists mostly of small mammals including Woermann's bat, Gambian pouched rat, Tullberg's soft-furred mouse, typical striped grass mouse, forest giant squirrel, Prince Demidoff's bushbaby, and juvenile grey parrots. Young ball pythons of less than 70 cm (28 in) prey foremost on small birds. Ball pythons longer than 100 cm (39 in) prey foremost on small mammals. Males prey more frequently on birds, and females more frequently on mammals.

=== Reproduction ===
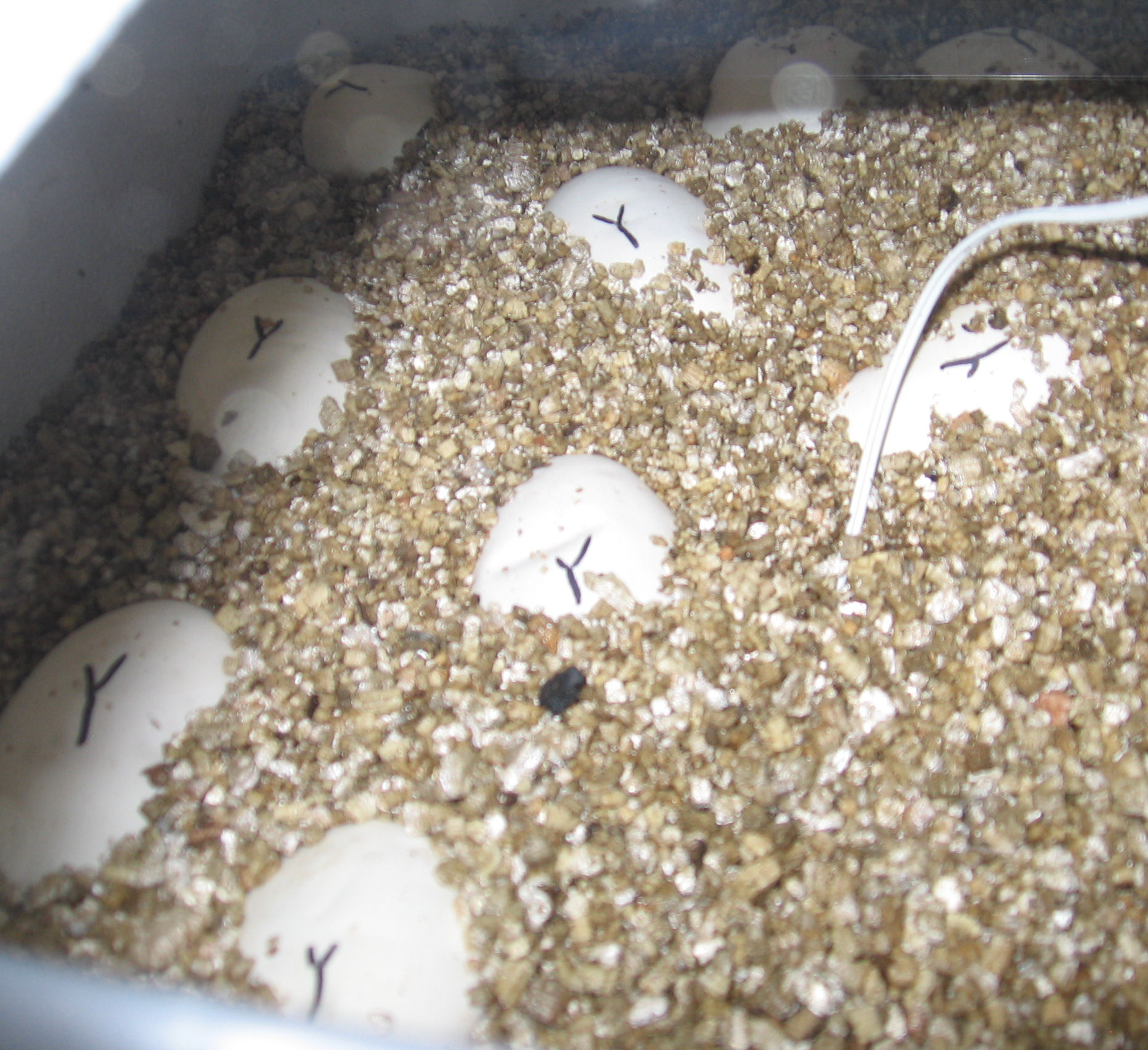
Ball python eggs incubating

Females are oviparous and lay three to 11 rather large, leathery eggs. The eggs hatch after 55 to 60 days. Young male pythons reach sexual maturity at 11–18 months, and females at 20–36 months. Age is only one factor in determining sexual maturity and the ability to breed; weight is the second factor. Males breed at 600 g (21 oz) or more, but in captivity are often not bred until they are 800 g (28 oz), although in captivity, some males have been known to begin breeding at 300–400 g (11–14 oz). Females breed in the wild at weights as low as 800 g (28 oz) though 1,200 g (42 oz) or more in weight is most common; in captivity, breeders generally wait until they are no less than 1,500 g (53 oz). Parental care of the eggs ends once they hatch, and the female leaves the offspring to fend for themselves.

Parthenogenetic reproduction was demonstrated in a pet ball python through genetic comparison of a mother and her early-stage embryos.

=== Health and disease ===
Several infectious agents and husbandry-related conditions are known to affect ball pythons, especially in captive collections. Respiratory disease associated with novel reptile nidoviruses (sometimes called serpentoviruses) has been reported repeatedly in captive ball pythons and other python species; experimental infection studies and outbreak investigations provide strong evidence that these nidoviruses can cause proliferative interstitial pneumonia and fatal respiratory disease in ball pythons. Surveillance and diagnostic studies and reviews summarize nidoviruses as an important emerging pathogen in pythons. Clinical signs commonly reported include increased respiratory effort, open-mouth breathing, nasal/ocular discharge, and anorexia and weight loss. Mortality can be high in affected collections.

Other viral agents (such as ferlavirus), bacterial, and parasitic infections also contribute to disease in captive animals. Poor transport, overcrowding, and inadequate biosecurity in trade and ranching operations have been implicated in increased disease risk and mortality. Good husbandry, quarantine, diagnostic testing, and veterinary oversight reduce disease transmission in collections and trade.

== Threats ==
The ball python is listed as Near Threatened on the IUCN Red List; it experiences a high level of exploitation and the population is believed to be in decline in most of West Africa. The ball python is primarily threatened by poaching for the international exotic pet trade. It is also hunted for its skin, meat and use in traditional medicine. Other threats include habitat loss as a result of intensified agriculture and pesticide use. Rural hunters in Togo collect gravid females and egg clutches, which they sell to snake ranches. In 2019 alone, 58 interviewed hunters had collected 3,000 live ball pythons and 5,000 eggs.

== In captivity ==
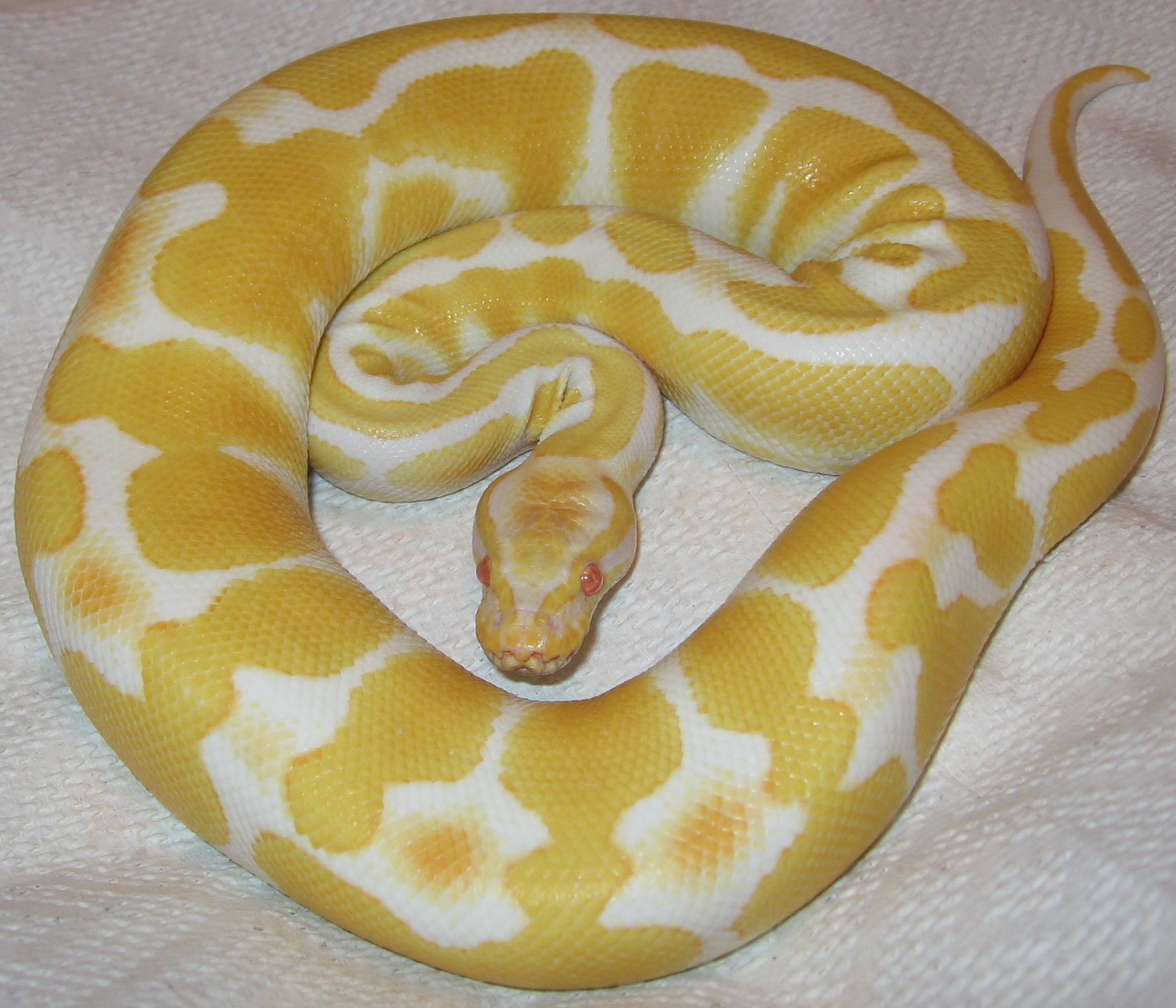
An albino ball python

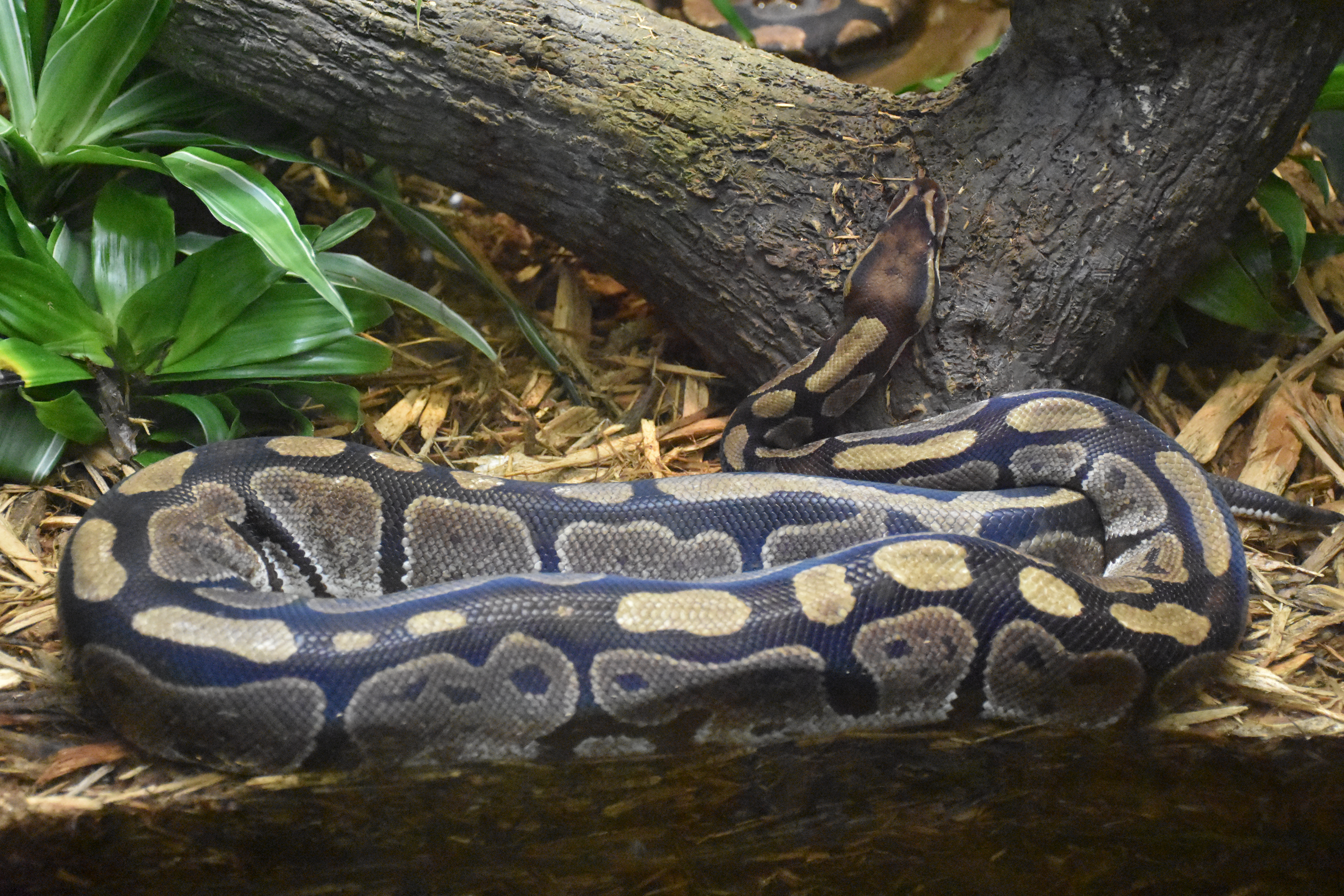
A ball python in the Bronx Zoo

Ball pythons are the most popular pet snake and the second most popular pet reptile after the bearded dragon. According to the IUCN Red List, while captive bred animals are widely available in the pet trade, capture of wild specimens for sale continues to cause significant damage to wild populations. This species can do quite well in captivity, regularly living for 15–30 years with good care. The oldest recorded ball python in captivity was 62 years at the time of her death, 59 of those years spent in the Saint Louis Zoo.

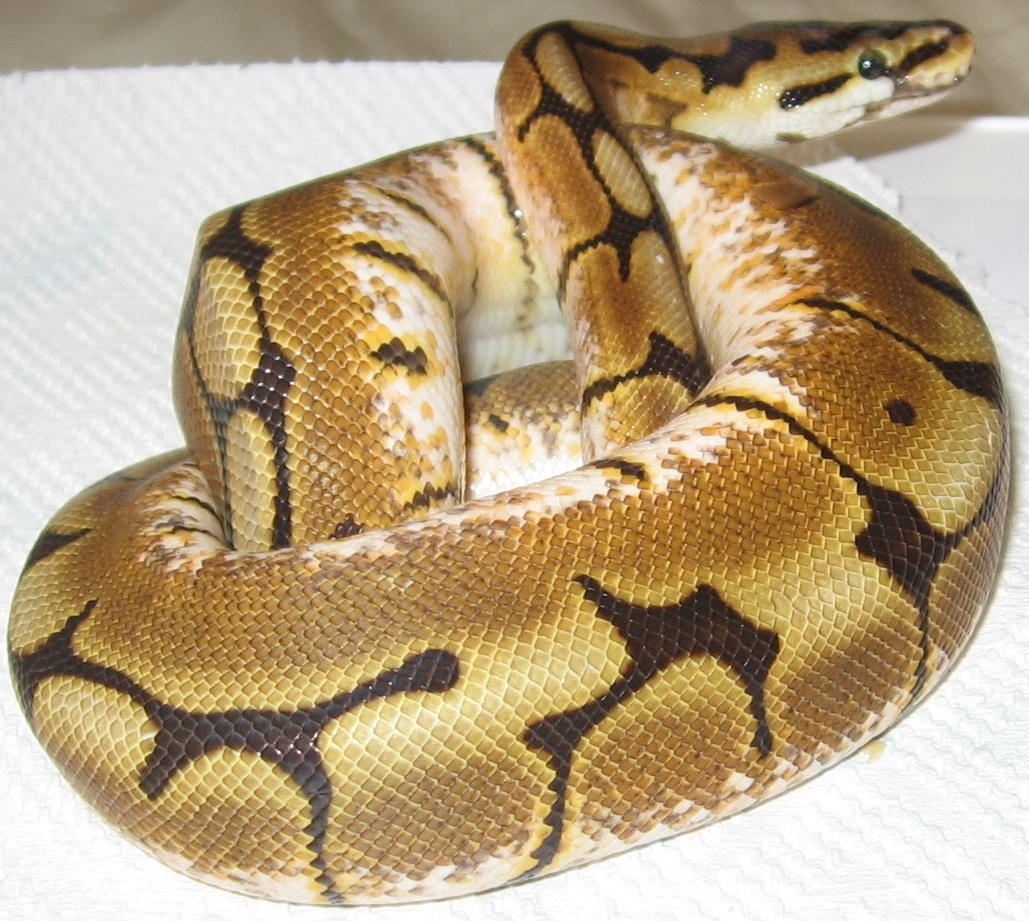
Juvenile spider morph ball python

=== Breeding ===
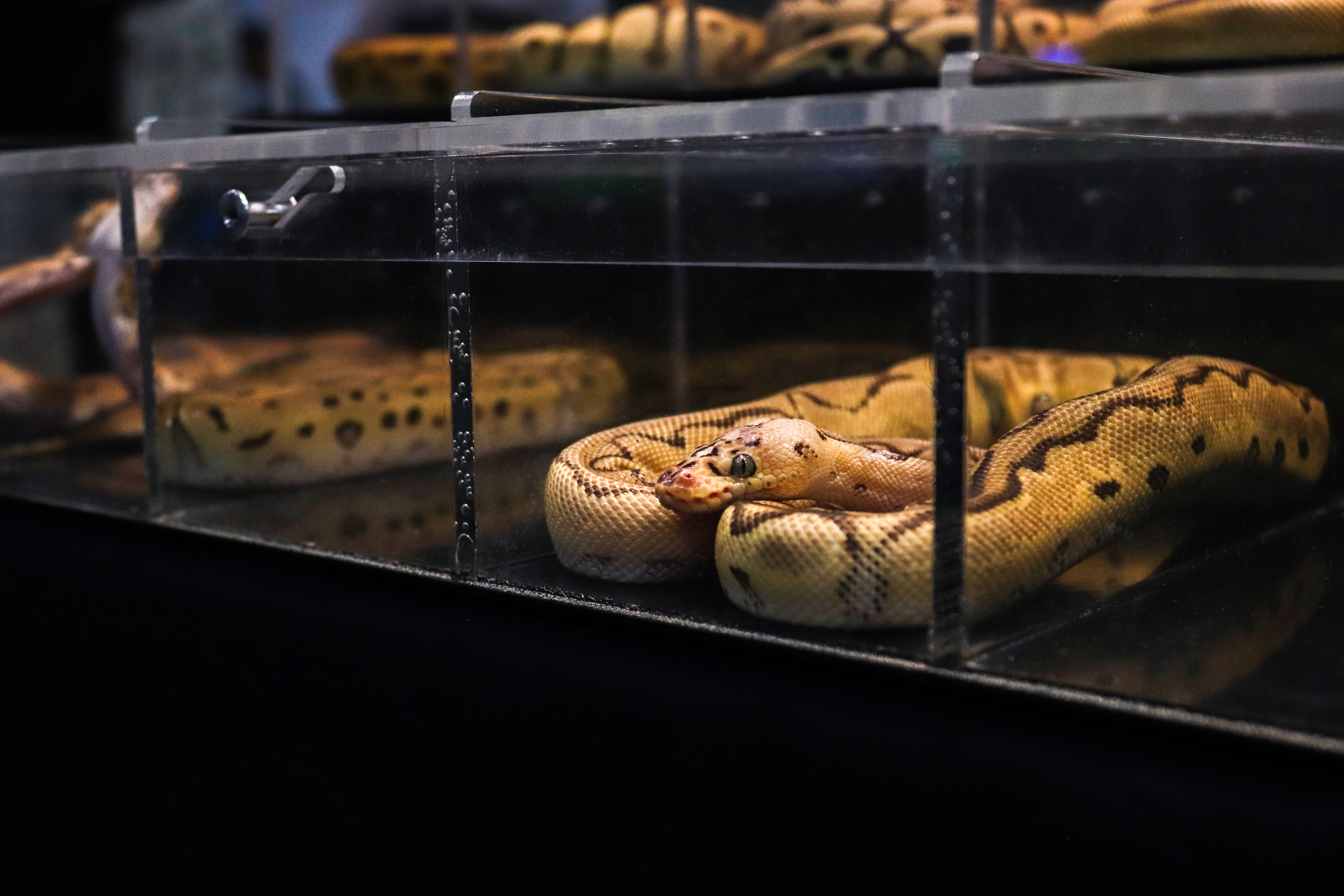
A killer bee morph on display

Captive ball pythons are often bred for specific patterns that do not occur in the wild, called "morphs." Breeders are continuously creating new designer morphs, and over 7,500 different morphs currently exist. Most morphs are considered solely cosmetic with no harm or benefit to the individual animal. However, the "spider" morph gene has been linked to a genetic defect, typically involving symptoms such as head tremors and lack of coordination that are collectively referred to as "wobble syndrome." It was originally thought to be due to a neurological disease, but is now known to be from a defect of the inner ear. Due to the ethical concerns associated with intentionally breeding a color pattern linked to genetic disease, the International Herpetological Society banned the sale of spider morphs at their events beginning in 2018.

== In culture ==
The ball python is particularly revered by the Igbo people in southeastern Nigeria, who consider it symbolic of the earth, being an animal that travels so close to the ground. Even Christian and Muslim Igbos treat ball pythons with great care whenever they come across one in a village or on someone's property; they either let them roam or pick them up gently and return them to a forest or field away from houses. If one is accidentally killed, many communities on Igbo land still build a coffin for the snake's remains and give it a short funeral. In northwestern Ghana, there is a taboo towards pythons as people consider them a savior and cannot hurt or eat them. According to folklore, a python once helped them flee from their enemies by transforming into a log to allow them to cross a river.
