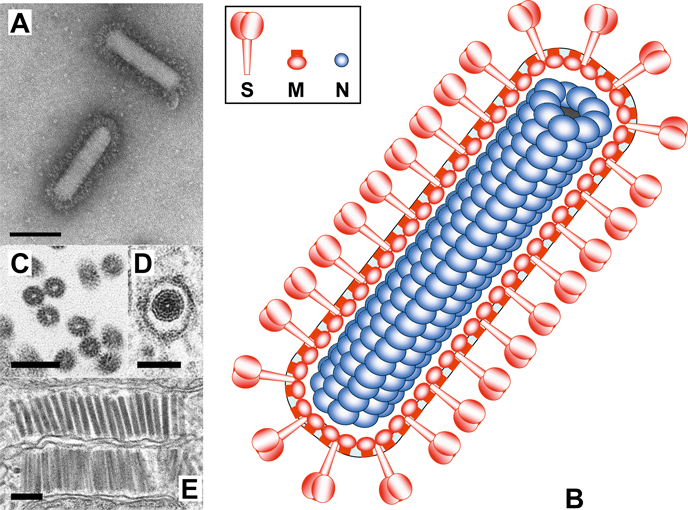
- Electron micrograph of virion and structure of white bream virus

Virus classification
- (unranked): Virus
- Realm: Riboviria
- Kingdom: Orthornavirae
- Phylum: Pisuviricota
- Class: Pisoniviricetes
- Order: Nidovirales
- Family: Tobaniviridae
- Subfamily: Piscanivirinae

= Piscanivirinae =

Subfamily of viruses

Piscanivirinae is a virus subfamily of the family Tobaniviridae within the order Nidovirales which comprises different fish viruses. The virions have a viral envelope and a positive-sense single-stranded RNA genome which is linear and unsegmented.

The subfamily contains two genera: Bafinivirus and Oncotshavirus. Both genera comprise rod shaped (bacilliform) viruses with relatively large genoms like they mostly occur in the nidoviruses. Occasionally, also strongly pleomorphic (e. g. spheric) virions were observed.

== Taxonomy ==
The subfamily contains the following genera, subgenera, and species:

- Bafinivirus
  - Blicbavirus
    - Bafinivirus bliccae (White bream virus)
  - Pimfabavirus
    - Bafinivirus pimephalae
- Oncotshavirus
  - Salnivirus
    - Oncotshavirus oncorhynchi
