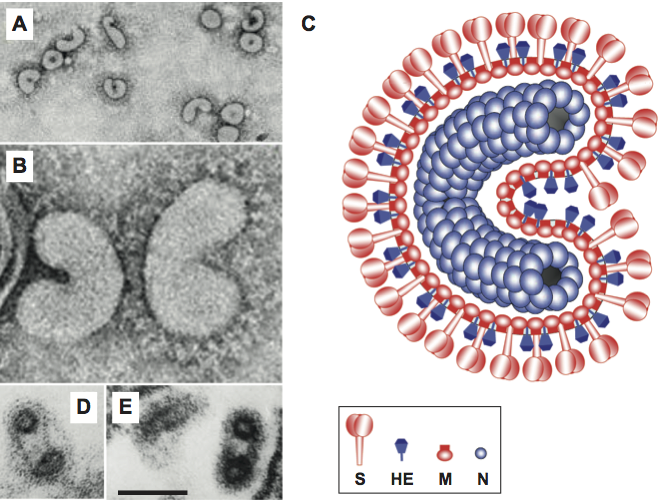
- Electron micrograph of virion and structure of equine torovirus

Virus classification
- (unranked): Virus
- Realm: Riboviria
- Kingdom: Orthornavirae
- Phylum: Pisuviricota
- Class: Pisoniviricetes
- Order: Nidovirales
- Family: Tobaniviridae
- Subfamily: Torovirinae
- Genus: Torovirus

Species
- See text

= Torovirus =

Genus of viruses

Torovirus is a genus of enveloped, positive-strand RNA viruses in the order Nidovirales and family Tobaniviridae. They primarily infect vertebrates, especially cattle, pigs, and horses. Diseases associated with this genus include gastroenteritis, which commonly presents in mammals. Torovirus is the only genus in the monotypic subfamily Torovirinae.

The discovery of the first torovirus can be traced back to 1970s. Equine torovirus (EToV) was accidentally found in the rectal sample from a horse who was experiencing severe diarrhea. The 'Breda' bovine torovirus was later found in 1979 while investigation in a dairy farm in Breda. They had several calves experiencing severe diarrhea for months. In 1984, torovirus-like particles were detected with electron microscope (EM) technique in the human patients with gastroenteritis.

== Virology ==
=== Taxonomy ===
Until recently, the toroviruses were not assigned any family. The recent molecular analysis of the virus revealed its similarities with Arterivirus and coronaviruses, which led to the inclusion of the Torovirus along with the Arterivirus in the previously monogeneric Coronaviridae. At present, toroviruses are included in the order Nidovirales sub family Torovirinae, family Tobaniviridae. Resemblance, molecular and genetic similarities, virion dimensions, behavioral ties and other characteristic similarities and differences are observed by the researchers for the taxonomic classification of the virus. In the toroviruses, the Berne virus has been extensively studied at the molecular level as compared to its other members. In 1992, the International Committee on Taxonomy of Viruses ICTV got enough data to consider torovirus in the coronavirus family due to the similarities in structure, replication behavior and the genetic sequencing.

The genus has the following subgenera and species:

- Subgenus: Bantovirus
  - Torovirus banli
- Subgenus: Renitovirus
  - Torovirus bovis, Bovine torovirus
  - Torovirus equi, Equine torovirus
  - Torovirus suis, Porcine torovirus

=== Structure ===
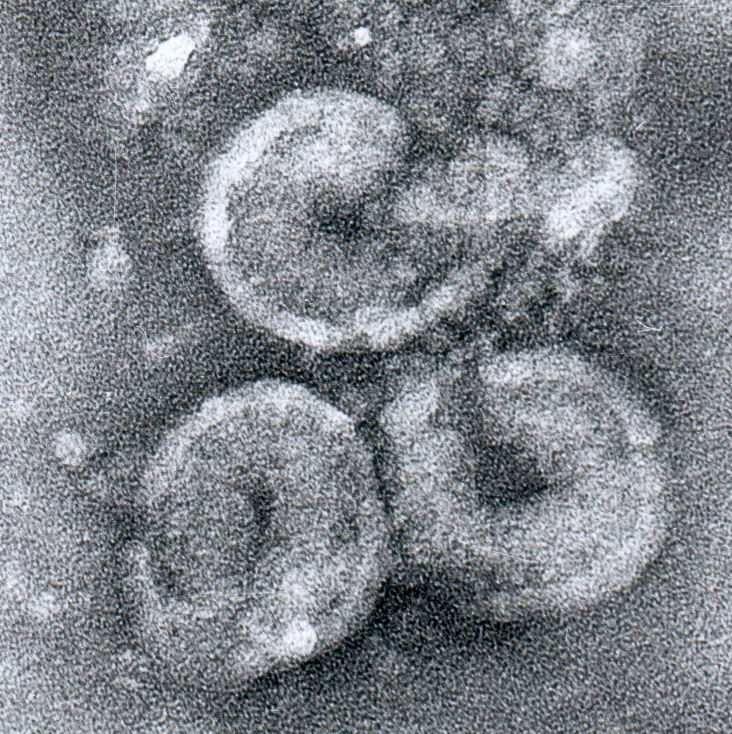
Three equine torovirus particles, they are about 100 nanometers in diameter.

Toroviruses (ToV) are single-stranded RNA viruses that have a peplomer-bearing envelope that is often correlated with the enteric infections in cattle and possibly humans. These viruses appear to occur globally, occurrence of ToVs have been reported from countries in various continents like Europe, Americas, New Zealand and South Africa. Torovirus particles typically possess a helical and symmetrical nucleocapsid that is coiled into a hollow cylindrical shape. The diameter is approximately 23 nm with an average length of 104 nm, where every turn cycle is at intervals of 4.5 nm. ToVs are pleomorphic, with size ranging from 100 nm to 150 nm with club-like outgrowths extending from the capsid. A nucleocapsid that is doughnut-shaped with helical symmetry is also discovered in Toroviruses. Among various species of the Toroviruses, only equine torovirus (EToV) can be grown in the cell culture medium due to which EToVs have been most extensively studied. The information from immunofluorescence studies and morphology of the bovine Toroviruses (BToV) intestinal cells has shown similarities among the EToVs and BToVs. Torovirus share some common characteristics with members of the related family Coronaviridae as they are round, pleomorphic, enveloped viruses about 120 to 140 nm in diameter.

=== Genome ===
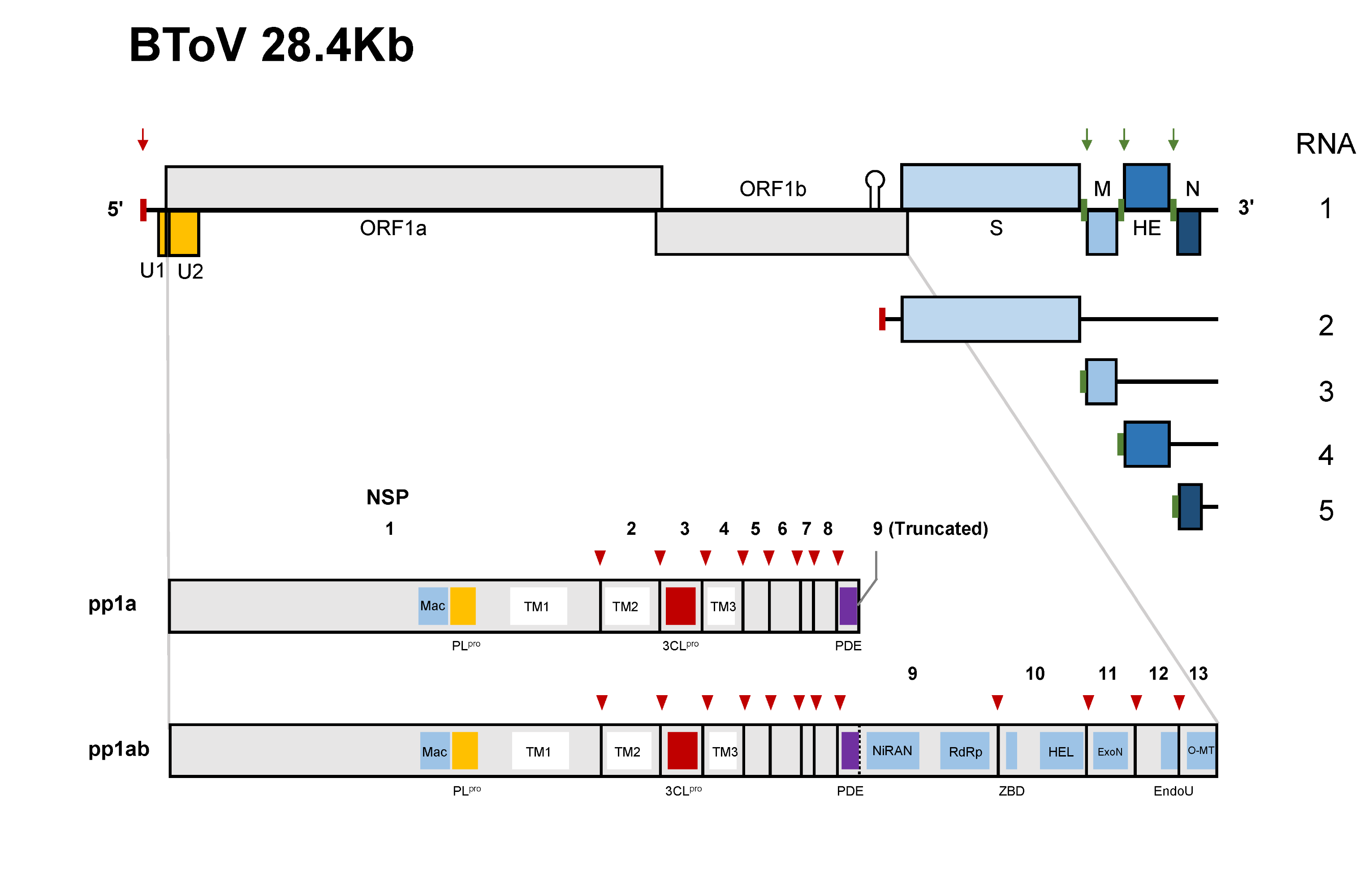
Genome organisation and gene expression of bovine torovirus (BToV)

Toroviruses have a single piece of single-stranded, positive-sense RNA. The total length is approximately 25-30kb and they possess a complex replication mechanisms that includes the use of subgenomic mRNA, ribosomal frameshifting, and polymerase stuttering. The genomic length of bovine torovirus is approximately 28.5 kb that is mainly comprised by one gene, replicase gene (20.2 kb). This gene contains two open reading frames, ORF1a and ORF1b that encodes proteins pp1a and pp1b. The first genomic sequence of the PToV (porcine torovirus) was done in Shanghai, China in 2014. Genome length of porcine Torovirus was found to be 28301 bp and possess 79% sequence identity with the bovine Torovirus genome.

=== Life cycle ===
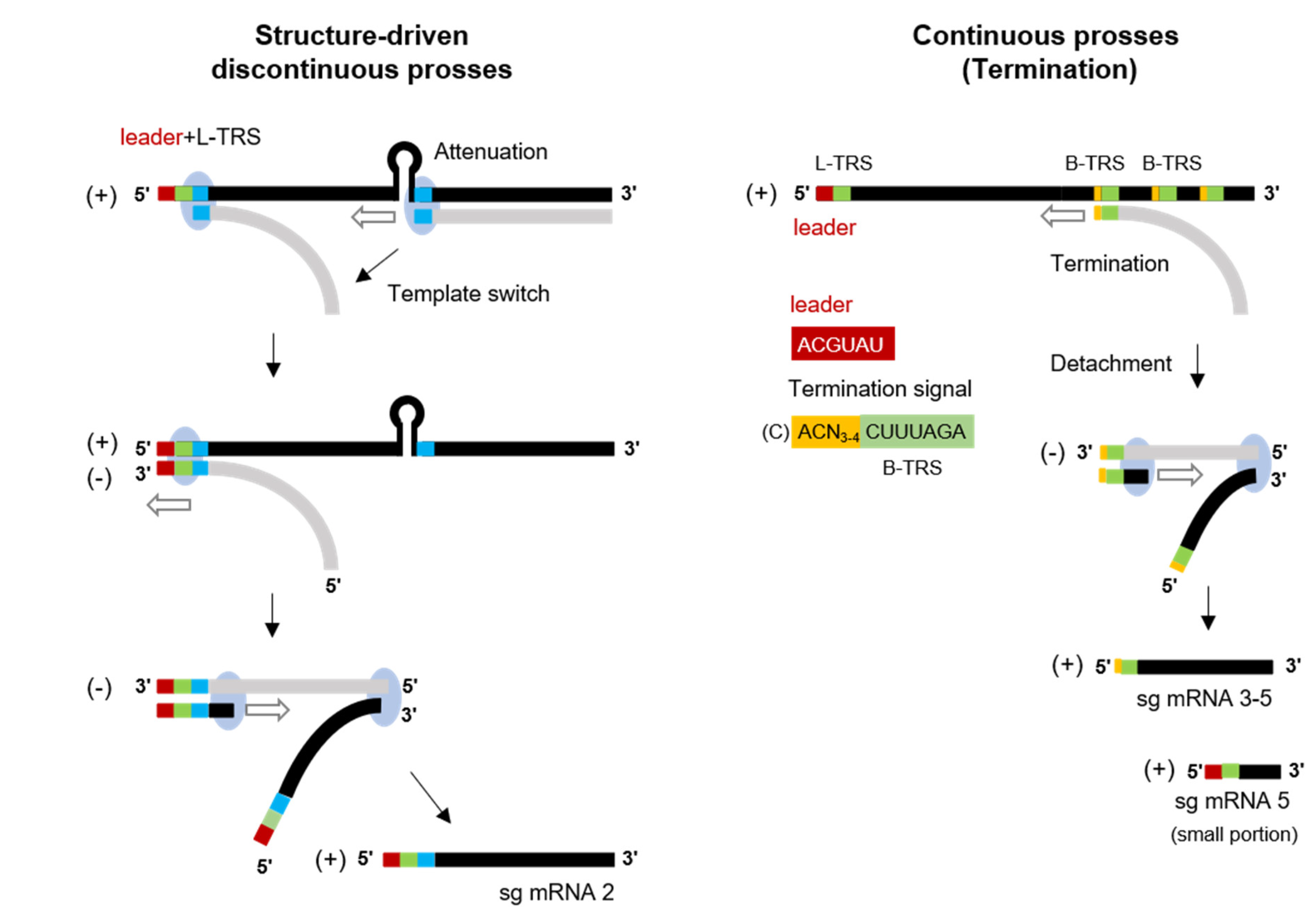
Discontinuous and continuous transcription of torovirus (ToV).

Cattle, pig, and horse serve as the natural host of Toroviruses and infection is thought to be via the faecal-oral route.

The Torovirus genome encodes for various structural proteins like spikes (S), membrane proteins (M), haemagglutinin‐esterase (HE) and nucleocapsid (N) which provides them the structural characterization necessary for infection and completing their life cycle. The first three proteins coding regions are deleted in the BEV species which enables them to grow in the cell culture, while other species are unable to grow in cell culture. The initial two-thirds of the torovirus genome has two open reading frames, ORF1a and ORF1b. ORFb1 encloses a domain that encodes for the enzymes such as RNA dependent RNA polymerase (RdRp) and the helicase (Hel) that are necessary for transcription and translation of the virus.

Life cycle of Toroviruses involves replication within the infected host cell. These viruses predominantly bud into the lumen of the Golgi cisternae in the cytoplasm. EToV can be seen within various parts of the Golgi apparatus and in the extracellular regions as well. The nucleocapsids of these viruses in the extracellular region has characteristic torus shape, whereas these nucleocapsids are rod shaped prior to budding to the host cell, which points to some morphological change happening in the maturation stage of the virus. Moreover, the nucleocapsids of the BToV and EToV are also found to accumulate in the nucleus of the infected cell.

== Clinical signs and diagnosis ==
In cattle, the disease causes diarrhoea and systemic signs such as pyrexia, lethargy and anorexia. In calves, it may cause neurological signs and lead to death in some cases. Many diagnostic techniques for torovirus infection in clinical specimens are now available such as hemagglutination (HA), enzyme-linked immunosorbent assay (ELISA), immune electron microscopy, hemagglutination-inhibition tests (HA/HI), and nucleic acid hybridization. Mostly torovirus infecting humans are probably closely related to BRV or BEV and relate to any previous history of some enteric disease or infection. It is also the reason that the molecular techniques are considered more promising than the serological assays. Pigs can be infected without showing any signs and symptoms that are physically visible.

Diagnosis of the viral infection involves electron microscopy, ELISA or haemagglutination inhibition.

== Treatment and control ==
Supportive treatment may be given to prevent dehydration and secondary infections. Control relies on good biosecurity measures including prompt isolation and disinfection of premises. As torovirus infections usually interrelates with severe diarrhea, it often led to dehydration. The most common treatment includes giving liquid therapies to the younger patients as the infection is most common in younger human population as well as in cattle. There are no as such specific preventive measures for the Torovirus infection control. Good hygiene and biosecurity practices are effective in prevention of the torovirus infection. Moreover, Antibody-containing colostrum can be given to the patients with estimated dose of 500ml/day. The natural course of infection mostly researched is done in the cattle as the virus origin is related to the enteric disease in the cattle. In an experiment associated with the infection of cattle gave the results that the virus commonly transmit itself under conventional conditions. The initial symptoms in the calves showed the development of diarrhea in first 2 to 3 days of the infection. Most of the calves had the mild dehydration and a few developed a mild fever. However, none of the cases required any therapeutic intervention and were treated usually with the changes in the diet of the infected calves. A research by (Vanopdenbosch et al., 1992a) published a study that torovirus respiratory infections emerges mainly in the first month of life and from 4 to 6 months of age in the autumn season peak. In all those infections, about 25% infections lead to sudden death. Besides other causes like diarrhea, pneumonia and respiratory problems, central nervous system related symptoms have also been reported in some incidental cases. Studies also reveals that the young calves infected with the torovirus need to be given fluid therapies as their body cold face severe dehydration during the infection. However, the adults recover by their immune response without any external treatment if any additional infections are not present. Many researchers also suggest that the disinfection and heat sterilization could easily destroy the virus but no scientific data or reports of such results are available so far.

== Human torovirus ==
In 1984, torovirus like particles were observed in human patients with gastroenteritis or severe diarrhea. A number of case studies were reported from various parts of the world. Torovirus like particles (ToVL) were reported in scientific studies from USA, France, The Netherlands, Canada, Great Britain, India and Brazil. The presence of the ToVL was reported mainly in children and adults with severe diarrhea.

Studies have been conducted to relate toroviruses to pathogenicity. Toroviruses has been found in various intestinal diseases in the children as well as the adults. A study of fecal excretion of torovirus concluded that out of 206 examined cases, in around 72 (35%) cases the torovirus was found. Toroviruses were more frequently found in the people that are more immunocompromised. Compared to rotavirus, the torovirus infections were characterized by reduced vomiting and increased bloody diarrhea. The immune system's antibody response mainly developed in the grown-up children who were non-immunocompromised.

In addition to gastroenteritis, toroviruses have also been found in the infants with necrotizing enterocolitis. In the same study, the severity of illness and mortality was not much affected in the patients with torovirus as compared to the patients who tested negative for torovirus.

== Antigenic properties and pathogenicity ==
Bovine toroviruses are proposed to have mainly two different serotypes: bovine torovirus serotype 1 (BoTV-1) and bovine torovirus serotype 2 (BoTV-2). Both serotypes of BoTV possess a hemagglutinin that reacts with erythrocytes from mice and rats, but not with human erythrocytes. The BoTV does not elute from rat erythrocytes after 90 min at 36 °C. Both the serotypes of the bovine Torovirus possess a hemagglutinin that reacts with red blood cells in the rodents usually. No evidence so far suggests that reaction with the human erythrocytes. Although, many recent studies revealed the presence of the torovirus in humans associated with many other enteric infections, diarrhea and conditions like gastroenteritis.

The exact mechanism by which the virus induces diarrhea is currently unknown, but the studies reveal that it could be due to infection and death of cells in the small intestine and villi crypts as well as the surface crypt enterocytes in the large intestine. It is also said that the watery diarrhea could be due to lesions in the colon that lead to reduction of water absorption by the cells in the large intestine. The pathogenicity of the torovirus presence has been widely studied and explored in the bovine species, especially calves in the initial stage of life around 4 to 6 months of age. Once the BoTV has been inoculated by an animal orally or nasally, it infects the epithelial cells of the villi and then extends to the components of the digestive system like the large intestine in the crypts of jejunum, ileum and colon. It ultimately results in diarrhea with in 24–72 hours of infection. The antigens of BToV has also been reported in the dome epithelial cells and Microfold cells, present in Gut-associated lymphoid tissue of the Peyer's patch in small intestine. Some researchers suggest that the BToV only infects absorptive enterocytes. However, there are researchers that also suggest that the viral replication could start in the immature epithelial cells of the crypts and can further spread to the villi.

== History ==
The discovery of the first torovirus can be traced back to 1970s. Equine torovirus (EToV) was accidentally found in the rectal sample from a horse who had severe diarrhea. The 'Breda' bovine torovirus was later found in 1979 while investigation in a dairy farm in Breda. They had several calves who had had severe diarrhea for months. In 1984, torovirus-like particles were detected with electron microscope (EM) technique in the human patients with gastroenteritis. In 1972, a virus was isolated from a horse in Berne, Switzerland. The virus did not react with antisera against known equine viruses and was shown to have a unique morphology and substructure. In 1982 a similar, unclassified virus was isolated from calves in Breda, Iowa. In 1984 particles resembling these viruses were discovered in the faeces of humans. A new family of viruses—Toroviridae—was proposed at the 6th International Congress on the Taxonomy of Viruses in 1984, at Sendai, Japan. However, the family is currently assigned as family Tobaniviridae with subfamily Torovirinae, order Nidovirales.

=== Evolution ===
Toroviruses, Coronaviruses and arteriviruses are in the order Nidovirales, a group of non segmented, positive sense single stranded animal viruses. Despite the differences in their genome size, varying host range and their replication strategies, the similarities in the sequence identities of the replicase proteins among different species of order Nidovirales ensures their common ancestry. Sequence analysis and comparison of the polymerase and helicase domains of coronaviruses and toroviruses reveled 40–45% identical amino acids in both families, providing evidences of large evolutionary distance between the two families.
