= Planarian secretory cell nidovirus =

Virus classification
- (unranked): Virus
- Realm: Riboviria
- Kingdom: Orthornavirae
- Phylum: Pisuviricota
- Class: Pisoniviricetes
- Order: Nidovirales
- Family: Mononiviridae
- Genus: Alphamononivirus
- Species: Planidovirus 1
- Virus: Planarian secretory cell nidovirus

Planarian secretory cell nidovirus (PSCNV) is a virus of the species Planidovirus 1, a nidovirus notable for its extremely large genome. At 41.1 kilobases, it is the largest known genome of an RNA virus. It was discovered by inspecting the transcriptomes of the planarian flatworm Schmidtea mediterranea and is the first known RNA virus infecting planarians. It was first described in 2018.

== Genome and expression ==
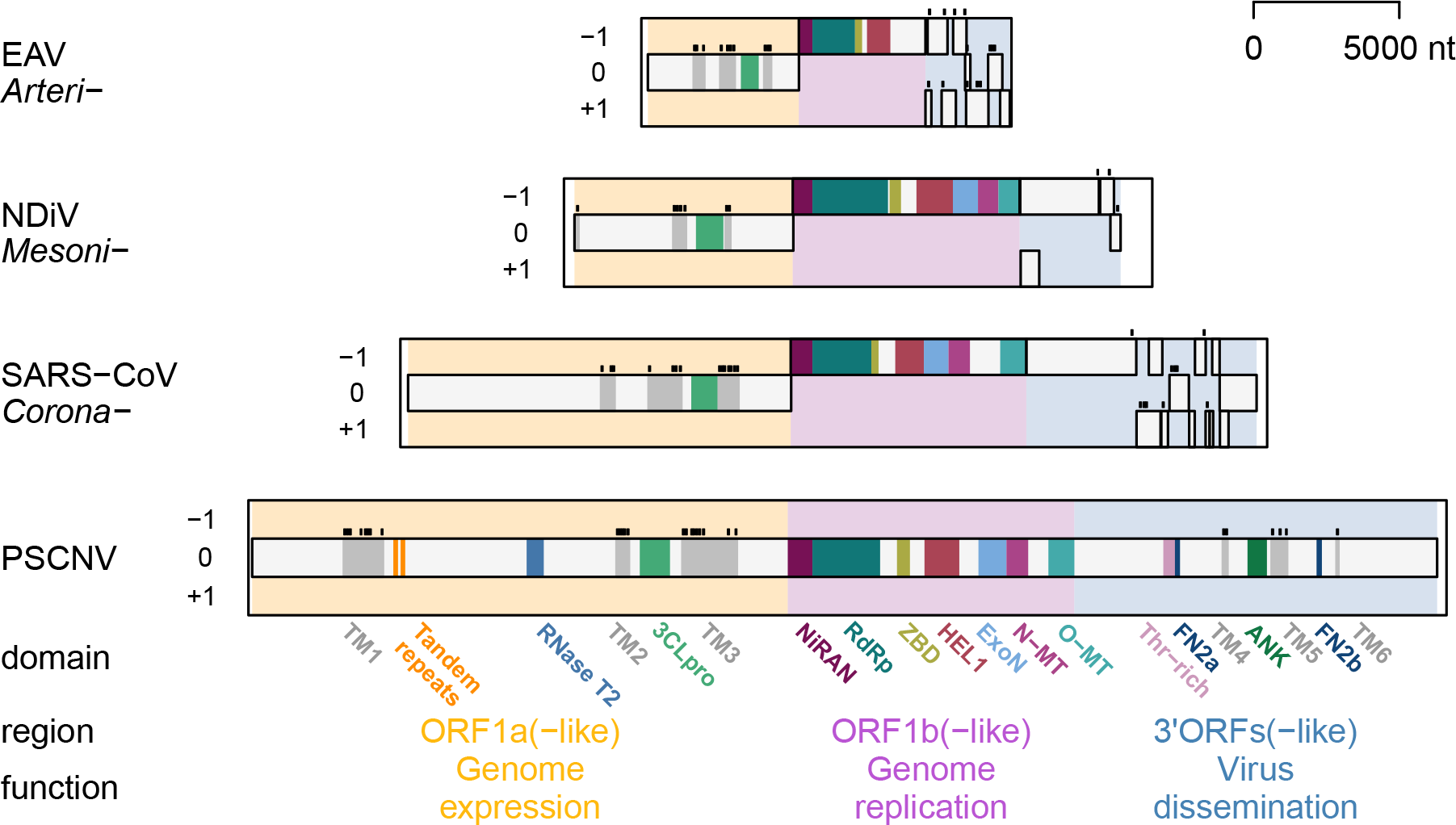
Comparison of the PSCNV genome and protein domains (bottom) to other nidoviruses: arteriviruses (equine arteritis virus), mesoniviruses (Nam Dinh virus), and coronaviruses (SARS-CoV)

The PSCNV genome is 41.1 kilobases long, the largest known genome in an RNA virus. It is substantially larger than coronaviruses, another group of nidoviruses known for large genomes, which are typically in the 27–32 kb range. PSCNV has an unusual genomic organization consisting of a single extremely large open reading frame (ORF) which encodes a polyprotein of 13,556 amino acids – the largest protein known to be encoded by an RNA virus.

Bioinformatics analysis of the genome suggests it is organized similarly to canonical nidovirus genomes, in which ORF1a and ORF1b encode viral nonstructural proteins and additional ORFs at the 3' end of the genome encode viral structural proteins; however, in PSCNV, these ORFs are fused and the resulting polyprotein is proteolytically processed. Where other nidoviruses use a programmed ribosomal frameshift separating ORF1a from ORF1b to regulate the stoichiometry of the proteins encoded by the two ORFs, the PSCNV genome has been predicted to contain an alternative frameshift mechanism to control relative protein expression. Compared to other nidovirus genomes, the region corresponding to ORF1b – which encodes core viral replication components – has expanded the most in the PSCNV genome.

== Protein components ==
=== Conserved ===
The PSCNV genome encodes identifiable protein domains that are conserved among nidoviruses – namely the main protease (3CL-like protease) flanked on either end by transmembrane domains, a nucleotidyltransferase domain known as NiRAN, RNA-dependent RNA polymerase (RdRp), a zinc-binding domain, and a helicase. It also contains methyltransferases and – like other nidoviruses with large genomes – a proofreading exoribonuclease (ExoN), likely necessary for sufficient replication fidelity to replicate a large genome. However, the ExoN structure and active site residues are divergent from other nidoviral examples, and the 3CL-like protease appears to use a serine–histidine–aspartate catalytic triad, in contrast to the cysteine nucleophile typical of other nidoviruses.

=== Novel ===
Uniquely among known nidoviruses, PSCNV also encodes several other identifiable protein domains, possibly acquired from the host. PSCNV encodes ribonuclease T2, two fibronectin type II domains, and three ankyrin repeats.

== Host ==
PSCNV has been shown experimentally to infect the secretory cells of planarians of the species Schmidtea mediterranea, including both asexually reproducing and sexual strains. It was discovered by searching the transcriptomes of these organisms for sequences similar to a coronavirus genome. It appears to be present in multiple such transcriptome datasets, suggesting that infection of laboratory S. mediterranea is common, especially in sexual strains.

== Classification ==
The PSCNV genome possesses the five distinctive protein domains conserved in all nidoviruses. Based on phylogenetic analysis of its genome, it clusters with other nidoviruses known to infect invertebrate hosts. PSCNV is the sole member of the subgenus Dumedivirus, in turn the sole member of the genus Alphamononivirus.

Further analyses of large groups of RNA virus genomes based on their RNA-dependent RNA polymerase (RdRp) sequences places the nidoviruses in the so-called "picornavirus supergroup", a very diverse group of viruses spanning a large range of genome sizes – from PSCNV, the largest RNA virus, to sobemoviruses, among the smallest RNA viruses – and sharing no common genes other than RdRp.
