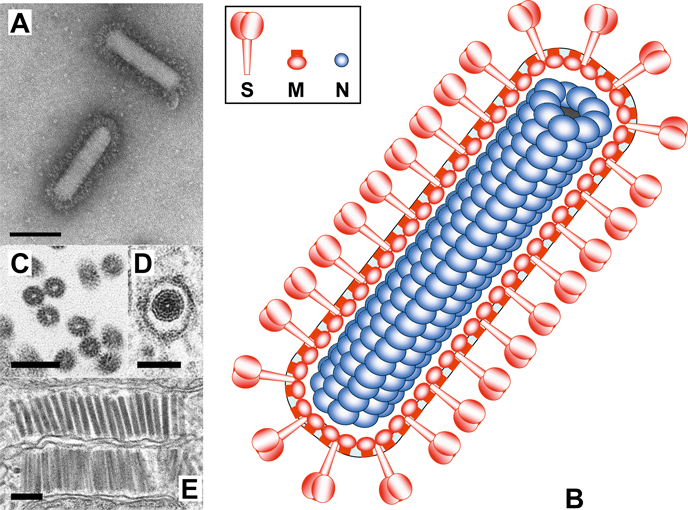
- Electron micrograph of virion and structure of white bream virus

Virus classification
- (unranked): Virus
- Realm: Riboviria
- Kingdom: Orthornavirae
- Phylum: Pisuviricota
- Class: Pisoniviricetes
- Order: Nidovirales
- Family: Tobaniviridae
- Subfamily: Piscanivirinae
- Genus: Bafinivirus

Subgenera and species
- Blicbavirus; Bafinivirus bliccae; Pimfabavirus; Oncotshavirus oncorhynchi

= Bafinivirus =

Genus of viruses

Bafinivirus is a genus in the subfamily Piscanivirinae. It contains two species, one being White bream virus (WBV) which was isolated from white bream in Germany.
