= YHD =

YHD or yhd may refer to:

- Yellowhead disease, a viral infection of shrimp and prawn
- YHD, the IATA code for Dryden Regional Airport, Ontario, Canada
- yhd, the ISO 639-3 code for Judeo-Iraqi Arabic, Iraq and Israel
