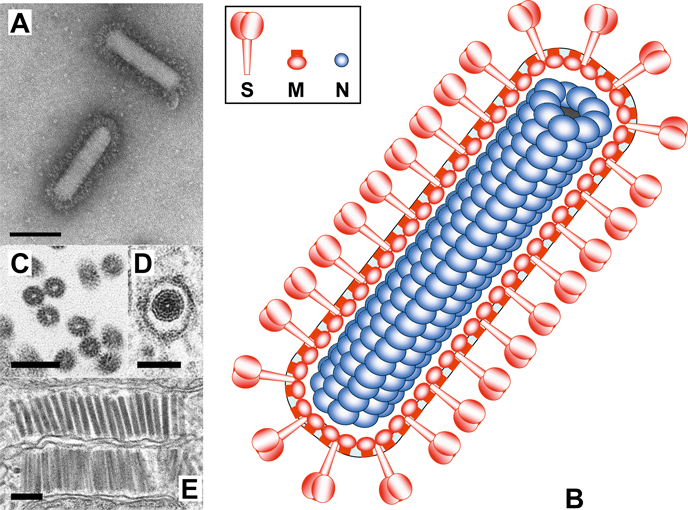
- Electron micrograph of virion and structure of white bream virus

Virus classification
- (unranked): Virus
- Realm: Riboviria
- Kingdom: Orthornavirae
- Phylum: Pisuviricota
- Class: Pisoniviricetes
- Order: Nidovirales
- Family: Tobaniviridae
- Genus: Bafinivirus
- Subgenus: Blicbavirus
- Species: Bafinivirus bliccae

= White bream virus =

Species of virus

White bream virus (Bafinivirus bliccae) is a species of virus. It is the sole species in the subgenus Blicbavirus, which is in the genus Bafinivirus. It was first isolated from white bream (Blicca bjoerkna) in Germany. It is a bacilliform (rod-shaped) positive-sense single-stranded RNA virus.
