= Alphamononivirus =

Virus classification
- (unranked): Virus
- Realm: Riboviria
- Kingdom: Orthornavirae
- Phylum: Pisuviricota
- Class: Pisoniviricetes
- Order: Nidovirales
- Suborder: Monidovirineae
- Family: Mononiviridae
- Subfamily: Mononivirinae
- Genus: Alphamononivirus

Subgenus and species
- Dumedivirus; Alphamononivirus schmidteae

Genus of viruses

Alphamononivirus is a genus of enveloped, positive-strand RNA viruses in the order Nidovirales which infect planarian flatworms. Member virus planarian secretory cell nidovirus (PSCNV) has the largest known nonsegmented RNA genome of 41.1kb of any RNA virus. The genus is monotypic. It contains the subgenus Dumedivirus, which contains only one species, Alphamononivirus schmidteae. Alphamononivirus is also the only member of the subfamily Mononivirinae, which in turn is the only member of family Mononiviridae, which likewise is the only member of the Monidovirineae suborder.
