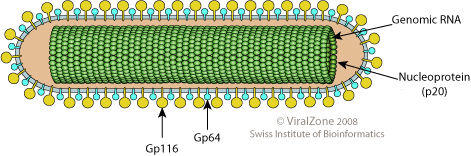
- Yellow head virus virion
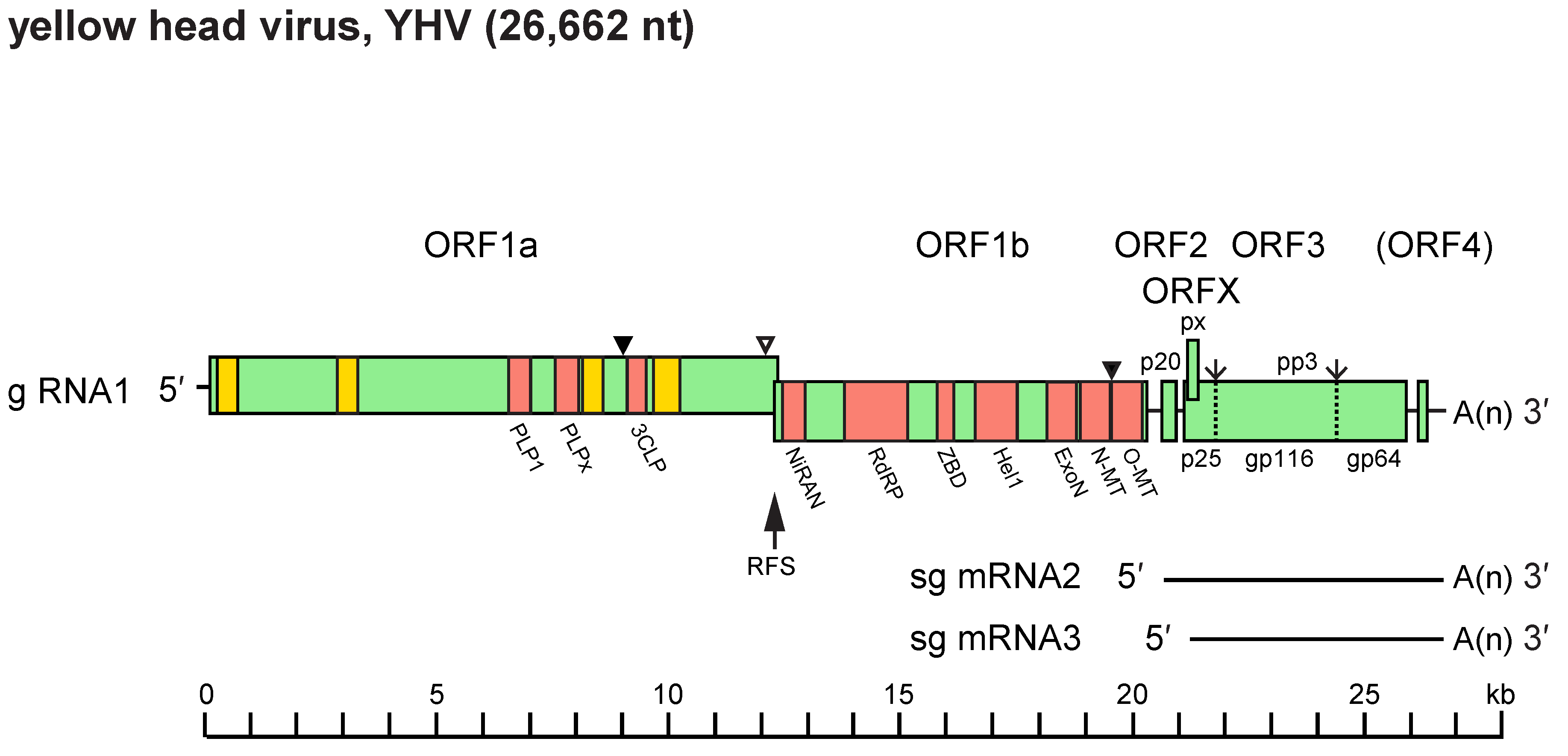
- Yellow head virus genome

Virus classification
- (unranked): Virus
- Realm: Riboviria
- Kingdom: Orthornavirae
- Phylum: Pisuviricota
- Class: Pisoniviricetes
- Order: Nidovirales
- Family: Roniviridae
- Genus: Okavirus
- Subgenus: Tipravirus
- Species: Okavirus flavicapitis

= Yellowhead disease =

Yellow head virus

Viral infection caused by Yellow head virus

Yellowhead disease (YHD) is a viral infection of shrimp and prawn, in particular of the giant tiger prawn (Penaeus monodon), one of the two major species of farmed shrimp. The disease is caused by the Yellow head virus (YHV), a positive-strand RNA virus related to coronaviruses and arteriviruses.

The disease is highly lethal and contagious, killing shrimp quickly. Outbreaks of this disease have wiped out in a matter of days the entire populations of many shrimp farms that cultivated P. monodon, i.e. particularly Southeast Asian farms. In Thai, the disease is called hua leung. A closely related virus is the Gill-associated virus (GAV).

== Clinical ==
The cephalothorax of infected shrimp turns yellow after a period of unusually high feeding activity ending abruptly, and the then moribund shrimps congregate near the surface of their pond before dying. YHD leads to death of the animals within two to four days.

== History ==
YHD had been reported first from Thailand in 1990, the closely related GAV has been discovered in 1995 during a yellowhead-like disease in Australian shrimp farms.
