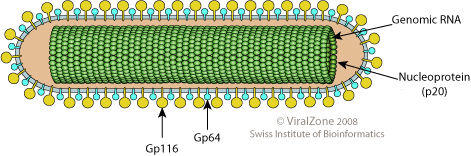
- Roniviridae virion
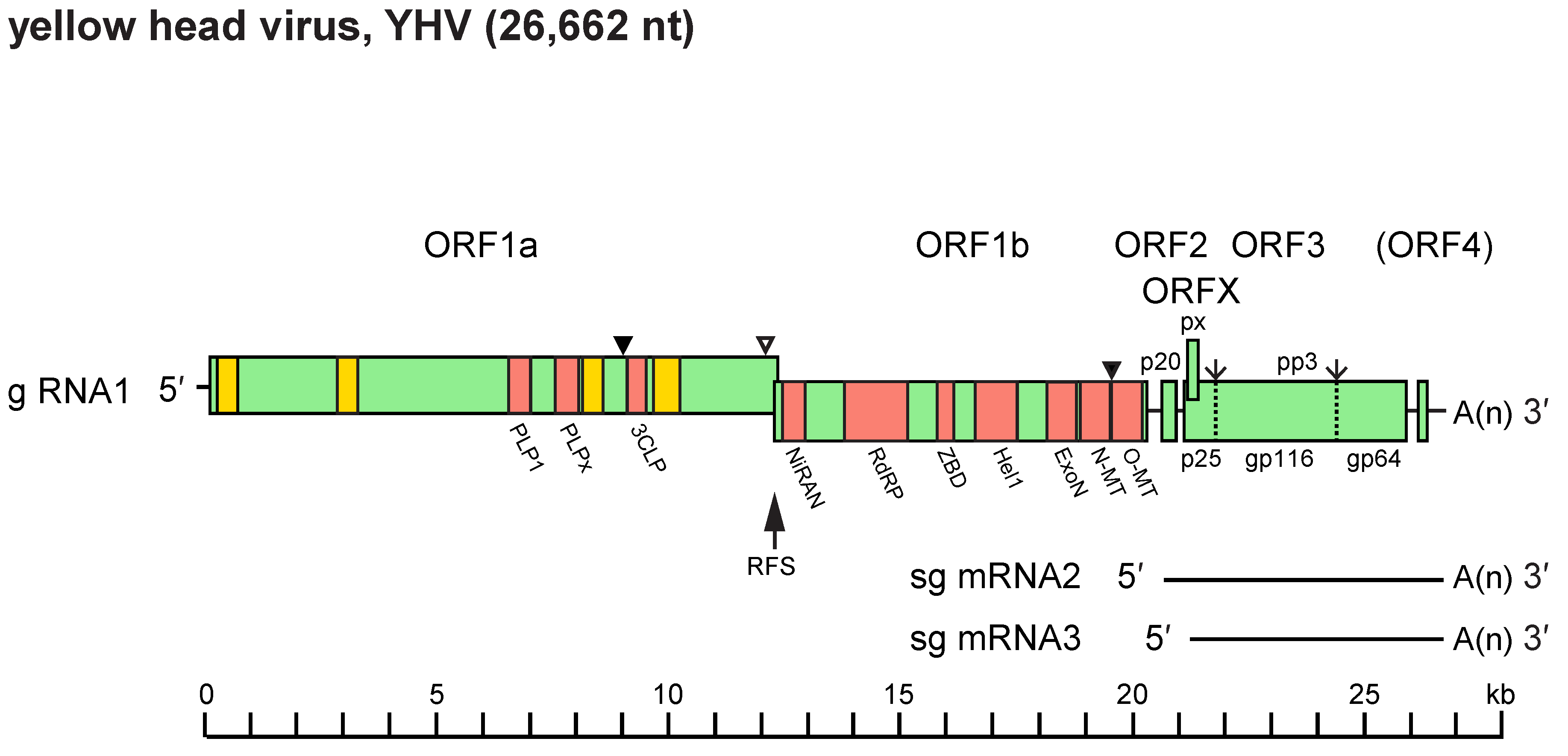
- Yellow head virus genome

Virus classification
- (unranked): Virus
- Realm: Riboviria
- Kingdom: Orthornavirae
- Phylum: Pisuviricota
- Class: Pisoniviricetes
- Order: Nidovirales
- Family: Roniviridae
- Genus: Okavirus
- Subgenus: Tipravirus

= Okavirus =

Genus of viruses

Okavirus is a genus of enveloped positive-strand RNA viruses which infect crustaceans. Host organisms are mostly shrimp. Viruses associated with the genus include: gill-associated virus (GAV) which causes reddening, biofouling with exoparasites, emaciation, and massive mortality; and yellow head virus (YHV) which causes yellow head, arrest of feeding, and massive mortality. The name is derived from the 'Oka' or lymphoid organ in which the viruses are commonly detected and in which pathology occurs during acute infections. Lymphoid organs are anatomical structures common to penaeid shrimp. There are three species in this genus.

== Structure ==
Viruses in the genus Okavirus are enveloped, with bacilliform geometries, and helical symmetry. The diameter is around 20–30 nm.

== Genome ==
Genomes are linear and non-segmented, around 26 kb in length.

== Life cycle ==
Entry into the host cell is achieved by attachment to host receptors, which mediates endocytosis. Replication follows the positive stranded RNA virus replication model. Positive stranded RNA virus transcription is the method of transcription. Crustaceans and mostly prawns serve as the natural host. Transmission routes are ingestion.

== Taxonomy ==
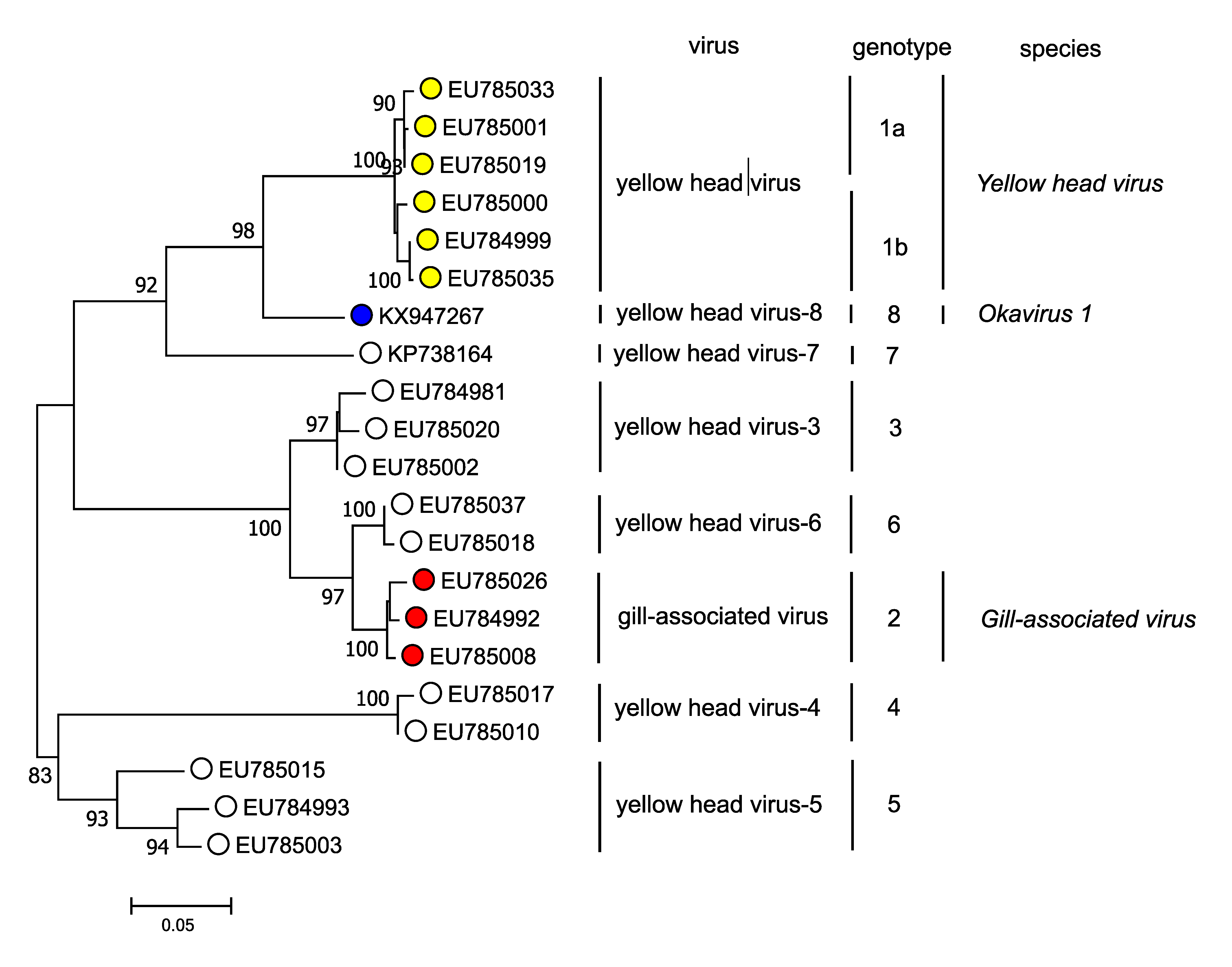
Phylogenetic tree of Ronviridae

The genus contains one subgenus with three species. Species are listed by their scientific name and followed by the exemplar virus of the species:

- Tipravirus
  - Okavirus branchiae, Gill-associated virus
  - Okavirus flavicapitis, Yellow head virus
  - Okavirus orientale, Yellow head virus type 8 (also called Yellow head virus genotype 8 and Yellow head virus 8)
