= Serpentovirinae =

Virus classification
- (unranked): Virus
- Realm: Riboviria
- Kingdom: Orthornavirae
- Phylum: Pisuviricota
- Class: Pisoniviricetes
- Order: Nidovirales
- Family: Tobaniviridae
- Subfamily: Serpentovirinae

Genera
- See text

Subfamily of viruses

Serpentovirinae, commonly known as serpentoviruses, is a virus subfamily within the family Tobaniviridae which is within the order Nidovirales. The virions of Serpentovirinae have a viral envelope and a positive-sense single-strand RNA genome. They infect vertebrates, mostly Ophidians, but sequencing has identified serpentovirinae infections in other reptiles including turtles, chameleons, and lizards. Although clinical significance varies across the clade, several pathogenic infections by this subfamily have been observed and studied, primarily in snakes with some observations in other groups. This subfamily comprises seven genera and 12 subgenera.

== Transmission ==
Serpentoviruses exhibit fomite transmission and transmission via the air. Fomite transmission occurs most frequently via stool or mucus that is carrying the virus. One study showed that there is no vertical transmission; the eggs of a mating pair of infected pythons were positive for serpentovirinae RNA, but the hatchlings were RNA negative when tested.

== Symptoms and diagnosis of infection ==
The symptoms of serpentovirus infections in reptiles are similar to some coronavirus symptoms in mammals (the Coronaviridae family also belongs to the order Nidovirales). Symptoms include shortness of breath, difficulty breathing, increased oral mucus discharge, oral reddening, anorexia and eventually weight loss, and death in untreated cases. Serpentoviral infections have also been found to cause lesions in the upper respiratory tract, upper gastrointestinal tract, and even the lungs. These lesions are usually inflamed and pneumonic, and can cause greater complications and morbidity when the animal is also infected with bacterial bronchopneumonia. It has also been observed that older snakes are more likely to be infected and also more likely to exhibit clinically significant symptoms.

Reverse transcriptase polymerase chain reaction can be used to detect viral RNA and is the most common form of diagnosis. Oral/nasal swabs are used to obtain samples both pre- and post-mortem. It is also possible to detect virions and viral RNA within the stool of infected pythons due to the python swallowing infected mucus. Additionally, nematode species within the GI tract are able to bioaccumulate the virion. However, the nematodes themselves are not infected. Specific treatments and therapeutics have not yet been discovered or prescribed, but research is ongoing to determine best practices and potential therapeutics.

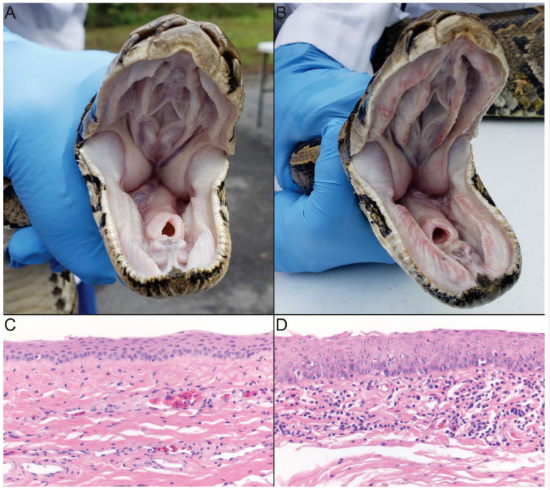
Appearance of the oral cavity and histologic samples of serpentovirus negative (A, C) and positive (B, D) Burmese pythons (Python bivittatus) from southern Florida, USA.

== Host susceptibility by phylogenetics ==
There have been observations that serpentovirus species diversity varies between animal populations and also geographic ranges. Phylogenetic analysis has shown that the different genera and species of serpentovirinae infect specific groups of snakes, and that some species exclusively infect non-serpent reptiles. However, it is currently understood that Pythonidae are the most susceptible to serpentovirus infection generally, with Colubridae and Boidae exhibiting the highest non-python-hosted serpentovirus species diversity. Additionally, sequencing of viral RNA from infected animals has shown the ability of serpentoviruses to become recombinant during replication and transmission, leading to rapid diversification.

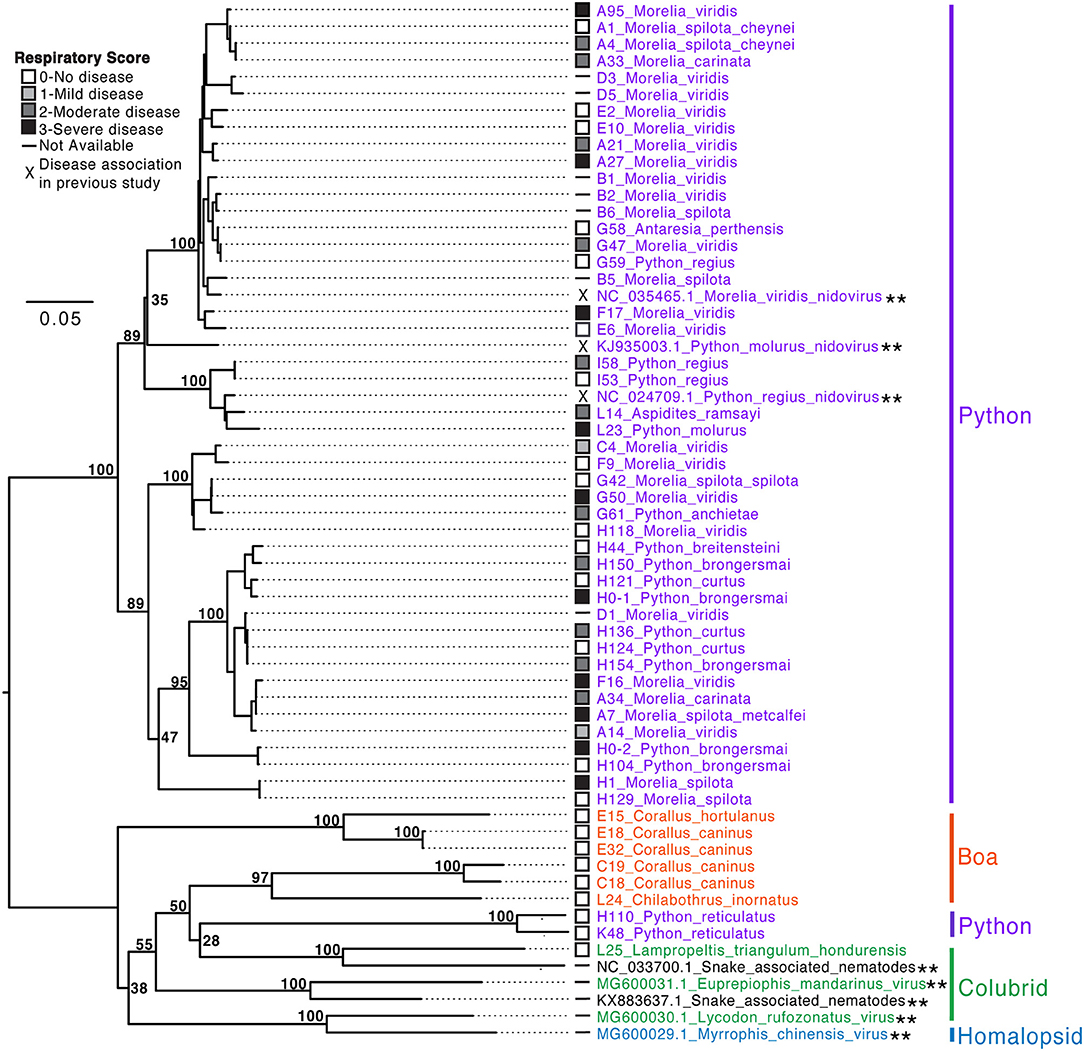
Experimental serpentovirus phylogeny that is color coded to Ophidian species specific infections.

== Taxonomy ==
The subfamily Serpentovirinae contains the following genera:

- Infratovirus
- Lyctovirus
- Pregotovirus
- Sectovirus
- Septovirus
- Sertovirus
- Vebetovirus
