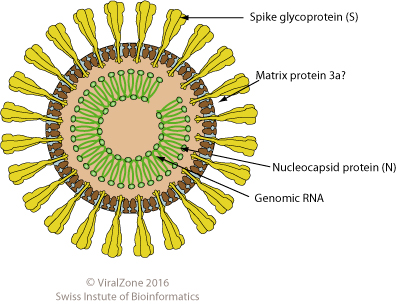
- Mesonivirus virion
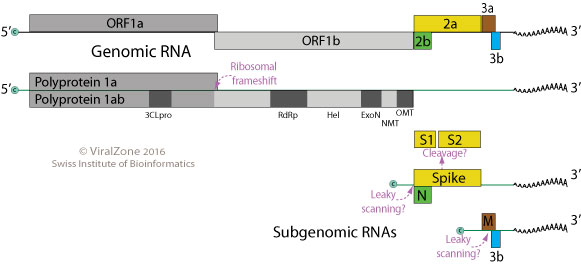
- Mesonivirus genome

Virus classification
- (unranked): Virus
- Realm: Riboviria
- Kingdom: Orthornavirae
- Phylum: Pisuviricota
- Class: Pisoniviricetes
- Order: Nidovirales
- Suborder: Mesnidovirineae

= Mesnidovirineae =

Suborder of viruses

Mesnidovirineae is a suborder of enveloped, positive-strand RNA viruses in the order Nidovirales which infect invertebrates. Host organisms include mosquitoes.

== Taxonomy ==
- Medioniviridae
  - Medionivirinae
  - Tunicanivirinae
- Mesoniviridae
  - Hexponivirinae
