= ADP-ribose 1″-phosphate phosphatase =

Enzyme

ADP-ribose 1′′-phosphate phosphatase

Identifiers
- EC no.: 3.1.3.84

Databases
- IntEnz: IntEnz view
- BRENDA: BRENDA entry
- ExPASy: NiceZyme view
- KEGG: KEGG entry
- MetaCyc: metabolic pathway
- PRIAM: profile
- PDB structures: RCSB PDB PDBe PDBsum
Search
- PMC: articles
- PubMed: articles
- NCBI: proteins

ADP-ribose 1′′-phosphate phosphatase (EC 3.1.3.84, POA1, Appr1p phosphatase, Poa1p) is an enzyme with systematic name ADP-D-ribose 1′′-phosphate phosphohydrolase. This enzyme catalyses the following chemical reaction

ADP-D-ribose 1′′-phosphate + H_{2}O $\rightleftharpoons$ ADP-D-ribose + phosphate

The enzyme is highly specific for ADP-ribose 1′′-phosphate.
