= Subgenomic mRNA =

Concept in genetics

Subgenomic mRNAs are essentially smaller sections of the original transcribed template strand.

== 3' to 5' DNA or RNA ==
During transcription, the original template strand is usually read from the 3' to the 5' end from beginning to end. Subgenomic mRNAs are created when transcription begins at the 3' end of the template strand (or 5' of the to-be-newly synthesized template) and begins to copy towards the 5' end of the template strand before "jumping" to the end of the template and copying the last nucleotides of the 5' end of the template, (finishing the 3' tail for the newly created strand).

As a result, the translated strand will have a similar 5' end to varying degrees with the original template (depending on which part of the template the transcription jumped over) and a similar 3' end to the template.

== 5' to 3' (positive sense) viral RNA ==
Positive-sense (5' to 3') viral RNA which may be directly translated into the desired viral proteins, undergoes a similar process as described in 3' to 5'. Portions of the viral RNA may be skipped during translation.

== Result ==
The result is that many different proteins can be created from the same mRNA strand, with similar 5' ends (to varying degrees) and same 3' ends. Or, different proteins can be created with positive sense viral RNA.

The 5' section on the newly created strand matches that of the template strand, and this section on the template strand is referred to as the "nested set".

3'                                                          5'
 GCCGCCCCGTATCGATCGTAGCGCACGTTATATATACGTTATTTCTGCGCGGAAAAAAAAA - Original template Strand
 
5'                                                          3'
 GCCGCCCCGTATCGATCGTAGCGCACGTTATATATAC---------------AAAAAAAAA      |
 GCCGCCCCGTATCGATCGTAGCGCAC--------------------------AAAAAAAAA      | = Subgenomic mRNA. 
 GCCGCCCCGTAT----------------------------------------AAAAAAAAA      |
 
 GCCGCCCCGTAT = Nested Set  - indicates jumps.

== Examples ==
This complex method of transcription is generally restricted to viruses, especially those of the single-stranded, positive-sense RNA or Class IV viruses using the Baltimore Classification System, e.g. viruses of the order Nidovirales.

It is primarily used for compacting more genetic information into a shorter amount of genetic material.
