= Okanivirinae =

Virus classification
- (unranked): Virus
- Realm: Riboviria
- Kingdom: Orthornavirae
- Phylum: Pisuviricota
- Class: Pisoniviricetes
- Order: Nidovirales
- Family: Roniviridae
- Subfamily: Okanivirinae

Subfamily of viruses

Okanivirinae is a subfamily of viruses. It is the only subfamily in the family Roniviridae. The subfamily contains two genera: Nimanivirus and Okavirus.
