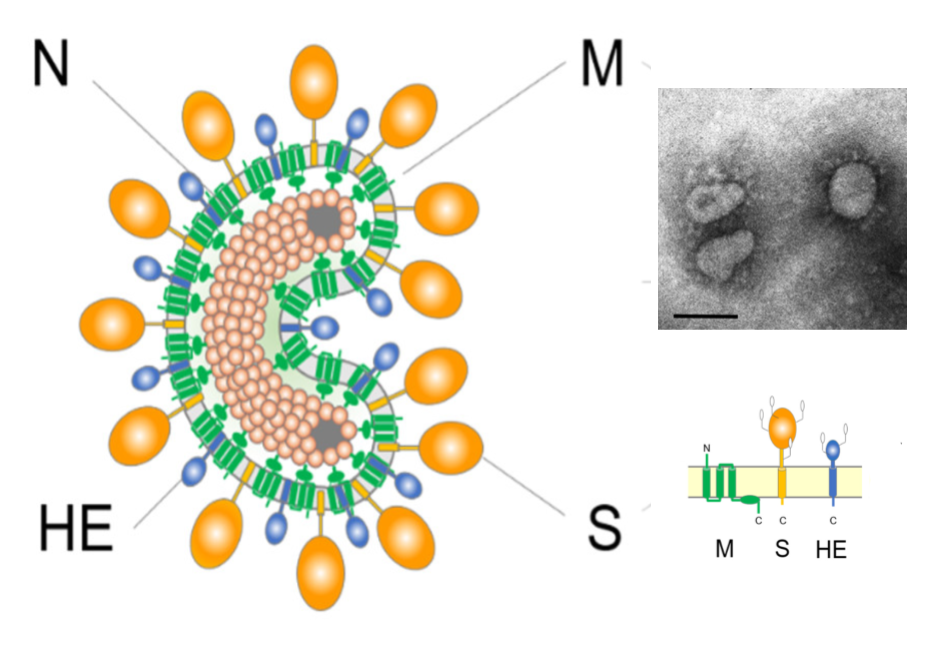
- Electron micrograph of virion and structure of bovine torovirus

Virus classification
- (unranked): Virus
- Realm: Riboviria
- Kingdom: Orthornavirae
- Phylum: Pisuviricota
- Class: Pisoniviricetes
- Order: Nidovirales
- Suborder: Tornidovirineae
- Family: Tobaniviridae

Subfamilies and genera
- See text

= Tobaniviridae =

Family of viruses

Tobaniviridae is a family of enveloped, positive-strand RNA viruses in the order Nidovirales which infect vertebrates. The most common host organisms include mammals, fish, and snakes, with some infections observed in other reptiles. The genome size of tobaniviruses ranges from 20 to 32 kilobases. The family is the only member of the suborder Tornidovirineae.

== Taxonomy ==
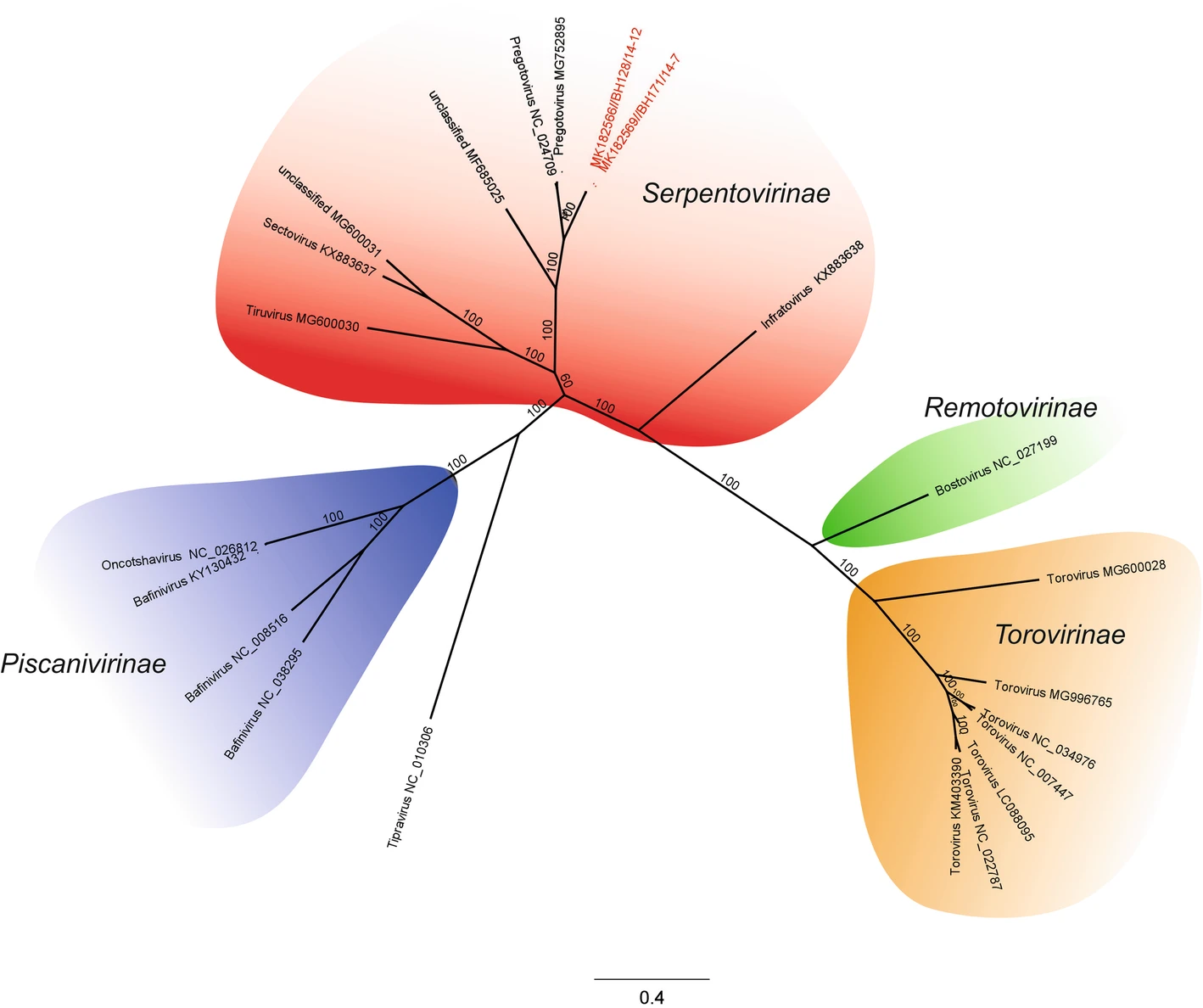
Phylogenetic tree of family Tobaniviridae

The family Tobaniviridae has four subfamilies and eleven genera:

- Piscanivirinae
  - Bafinivirus
  - Oncotshavirus
- Remotovirinae
  - Bostovirus
- Serpentovirinae
  - Infratovirus
  - Lyctovirus
  - Pregotovirus
  - Sectovirus
  - Septovirus
  - Sertovirus
  - Vebetovirus
- Torovirinae
  - Torovirus
