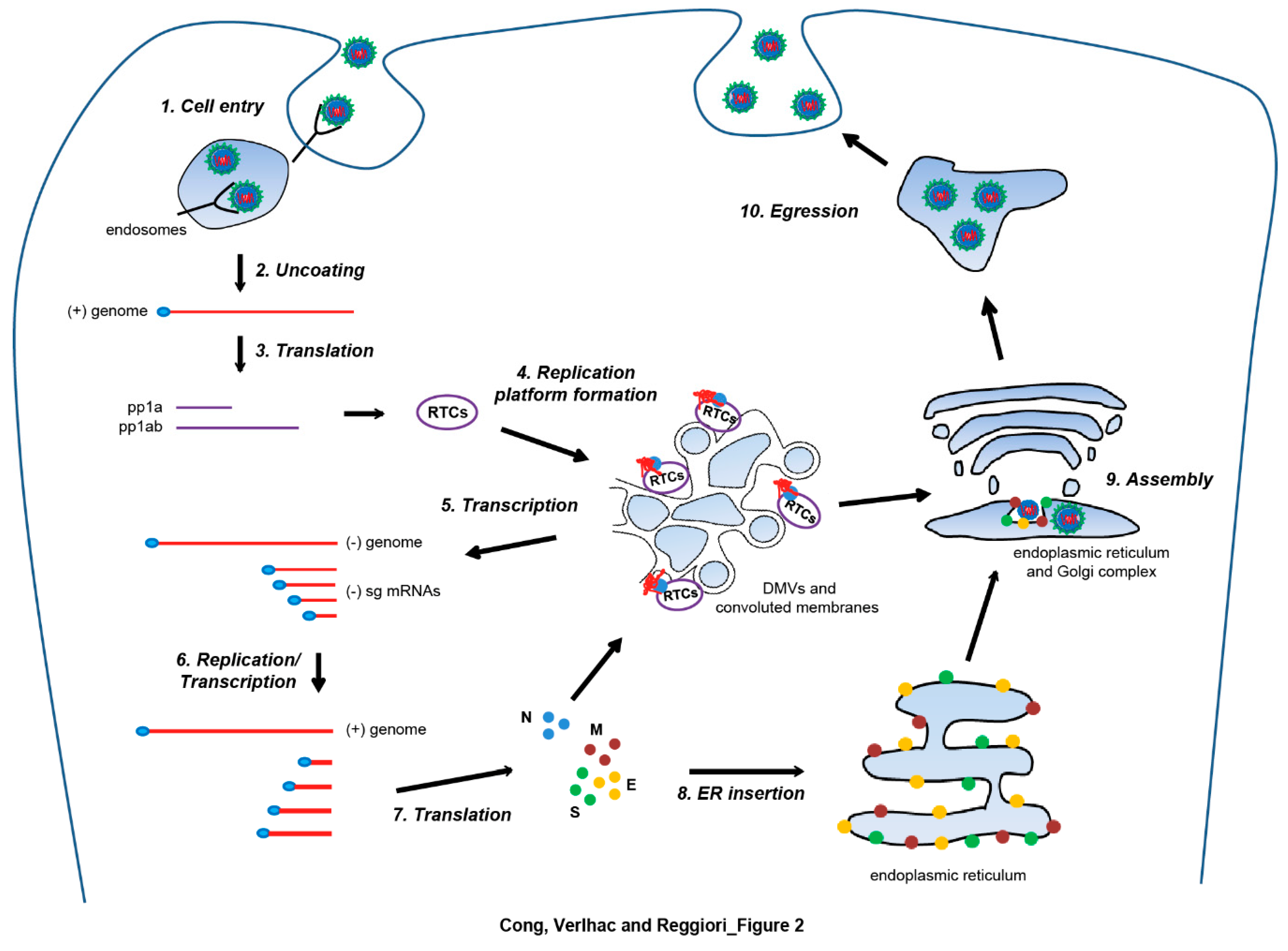
- Life cycle of nidoviruses

Virus classification
- (unranked): Virus
- Realm: Riboviria
- Kingdom: Orthornavirae
- Phylum: Pisuviricota
- Class: Pisoniviricetes
- Order: Nidovirales

= Nidovirales =

Order of positive-sense, single-stranded RNA viruses

Nidovirales is an order of enveloped, positive-strand RNA viruses which infect vertebrates and invertebrates. Host organisms include mammals, birds, reptiles, amphibians, fish, arthropods, molluscs, and helminths. The order includes the families Coronaviridae, Arteriviridae, Roniviridae, Tobaniviridae, and Mesoniviridae.

Member viruses have a viral envelope and a positive-sense, single-stranded RNA genome which is capped and polyadenylated. Nidoviruses are named for the Latin nidus, meaning nest, as all viruses in this order produce a 3' co-terminal nested set of subgenomic mRNAs during infection.

== Virology ==
=== Structure ===
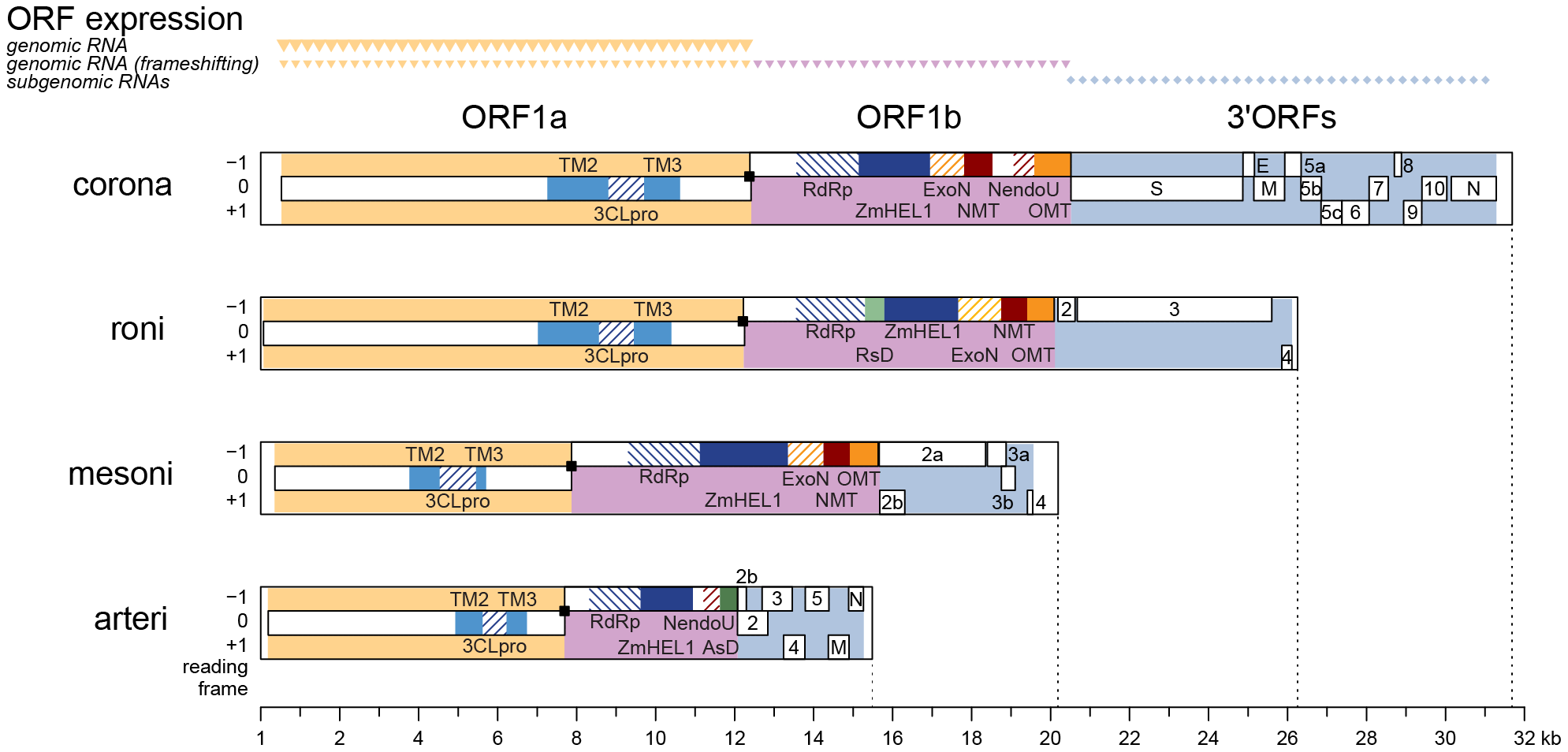
Comparison of genomes and proteomes of different families of nidoviruses

Nidoviruses have a viral envelope and a positive-sense, single-stranded RNA genome which is capped and polyadenylated. The group expresses structural proteins separately from the nonstructural ones. The structural proteins are encoded at the 3' region of the genome and are expressed from a set of subgenomic mRNAs.

Member viruses encode one main proteinase and between one and three accessory proteinases which are mainly involved in expressing the replicase gene. These proteinases are also responsible for activating or inactivating specific proteins at the correct time in the virus life cycle, ensuring replication occurs at the right time.

=== Genome ===
Nidoviruses can be distinguished from other RNA viruses by a constellation of seven conserved domains—5'-TM2-3CLpro-TM3-RdRp-Zm-HEL1-NendoU-3'—with the first three being encoded in ORF1a and the remaining four in ORF1b. TM2 and TM3 and transmembrane domains; RdRp is the RNA-dependent RNA polymerase; Zm is a Zn-cluster binding domain fused with a helicase (HEL1); 3CLpro is a 3C-like protease; and NendoU is an uridylate-specific endonuclease. The 3CLpro has a catalytic His-Cys dyad, and is related to the SARS coronavirus main proteinase (Mpro).

Most, but not all, nidovirus subgenomic RNAs contain a 5′ leader sequence derived from the 5′ end of the genomic RNA. The frameshift that generates ORF1b frameshift occurs at a UUUAAAC heptanucleotide 'slippery' sequence located upstream of the ORF1a stop codon and a putative RNA pseudoknot structure.

Many proteins have been identified on the genomes of Nidovirales, but their function has not yet been determined. Other enzymes that may be present in the genome include papain-like proteases, ADP-ribose/poly(ADP-ribose)-binding or ADP-ribose 1''-phosphate phosphatase activities and cyclic nucleotide phosphodiesterase.

== Phylogenetics ==
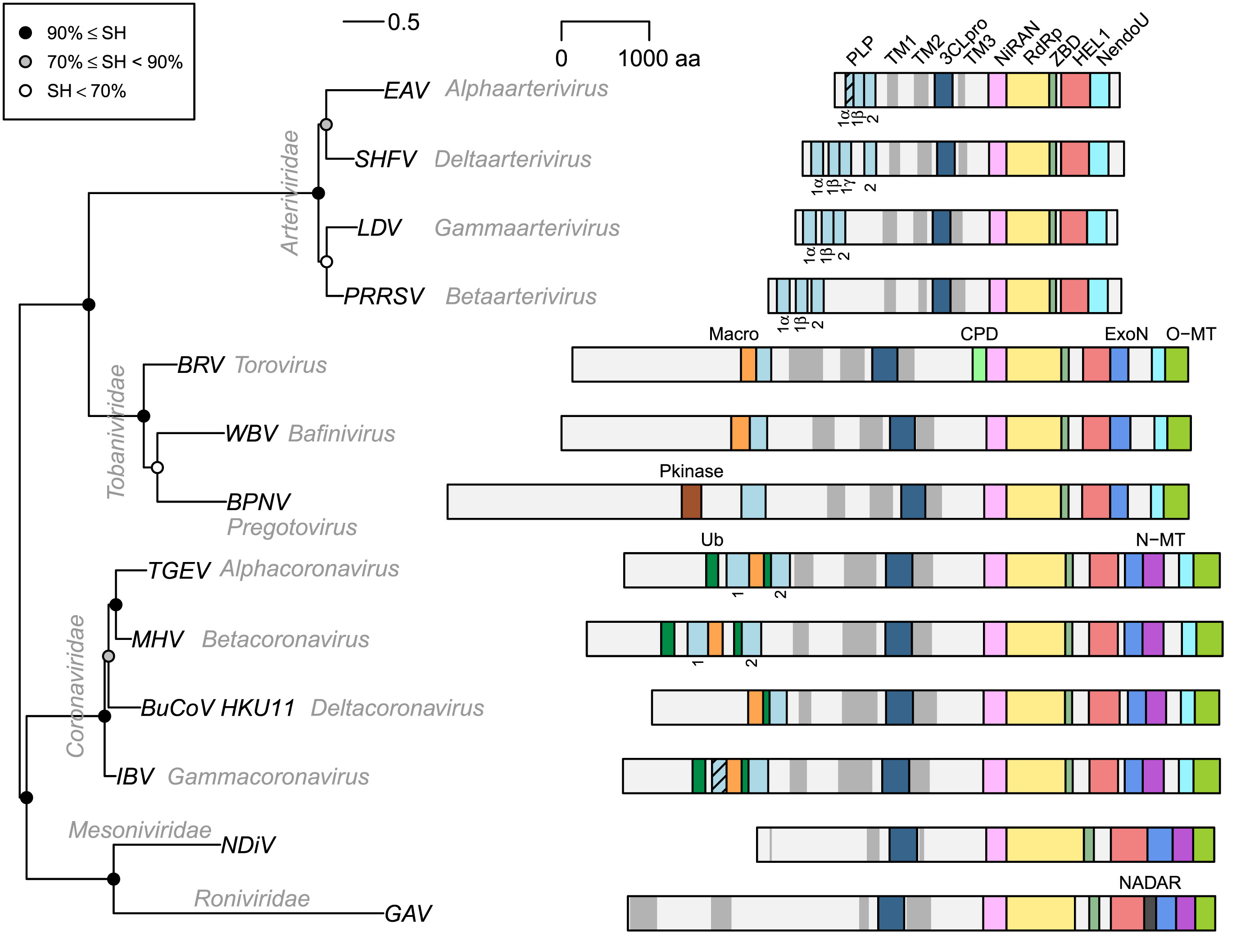
Phylogeny and pp1ab domain organization of selected nidoviruses.

The order Nidovirales can be divided into two clades depending on the size of the genome: those with large genomes (26.3–31.7 kilobases) which included the Coronaviridae and Roniviridae (the large nidoviruses) and those with small genomes (the small nidoviruses)—a clade that includes the distantly related Arteriviridae (12.7–15.7 kb).

The large nidoviruses encode both a 2'-O-methyltransferase and a 3'–5' exoribonuclease (ExoN)—the latter being very unusual for an RNA virus. They also encode a superfamily 1 helicase, uridylate-specific endonuclease (an enzyme unique to nidoviruses) and several proteases.

Nidoviruses as a group have the largest RNA genomes of viruses. The largest reported genomes for RNA viruses are Crassostrea gigas nidovirus (CGNV) and Pacific oyster nidoviirus 1 (PONV 1); they are biseqmented, ~64kb in size, and infect Pacific oysters. They are members of a widely distributed group of viruses that belong to the proposed family Megarnaviridae. Previously, the largest reported genome was the 41.1kb, nonsegmented genome of planarian secretory cell nidovirus (PSCNV) that infect a planarian flatworm.

== Taxonomy ==
The following suborders and families are recognized (-virineae denotes suborders and -viridae denotes families):

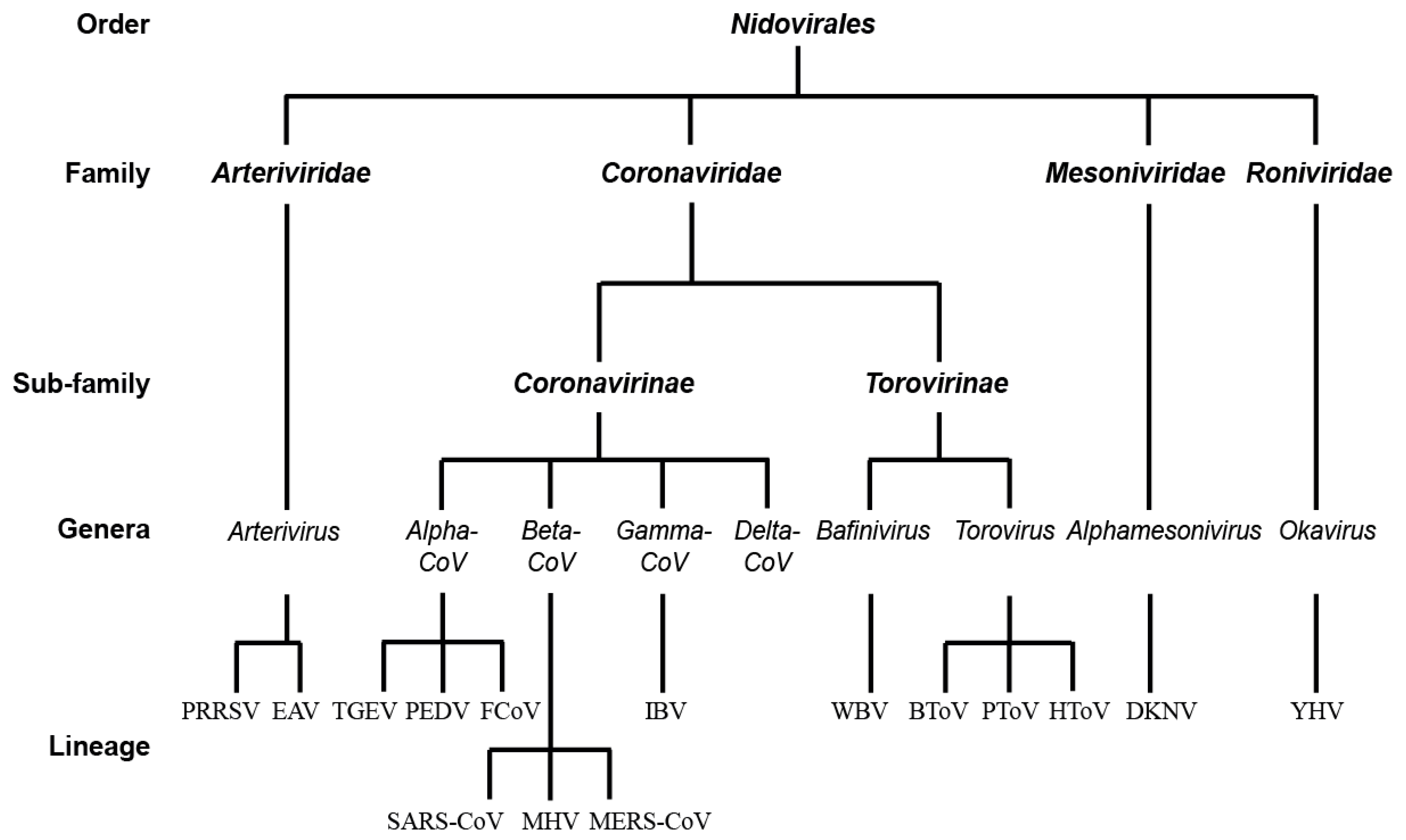
Taxonomy tree of the order Nidovirales

- Abnidovirineae
  - Abyssoviridae
- Arnidovirineae
  - Arteriviridae
  - Cremegaviridae
  - Gresnaviridae
  - Olifoviridae
- Cornidovirineae
  - Coronaviridae
- Mesnidovirineae
  - Medioniviridae
  - Mesoniviridae
- Monidovirineae
  - Mononiviridae
- Nanidovirineae
  - Nanghoshaviridae
  - Nanhypoviridae
- Ronidovirineae
  - Euroniviridae
  - Roniviridae
- Tornidovirineae
  - Tobaniviridae

== See also ==
- Animal viruses
- Coronaviruses
- Serpentoviruses
