= Epizootic hemorrhagic disease virus =

Virus classification
- (unranked): Virus
- Realm: Riboviria
- Kingdom: Orthornavirae
- Phylum: Duplornaviricota
- Class: Resentoviricetes
- Order: Reovirales
- Family: Sedoreoviridae
- Genus: Orbivirus
- Species: Orbivirus ruminantium

Species of virus

Epizootic hemorrhagic disease virus, often abbreviated to EHDV, is a species of the genus Orbivirus, a member of the family Sedoreoviridae. It is the causative agent of epizootic hemorrhagic disease, an acute, infectious, and often fatal disease of wild ruminants. In North America, the most severely affected ruminant is the white-tailed deer (Odocoileus virginianus), although it may also infect mule deer, black-tailed deer, elk, bighorn sheep, and pronghorn antelope. It is often mistakenly referred to as "bluetongue virus" (BTV), another Orbivirus that like EHDV causes the host to develop a characteristic blue tongue due to systemic hemorrhaging and lack of oxygen in the blood. Despite showing clinical similarities, these two viruses are genetically distinct.

Worldwide, eight serotypes of EHDV have been identified. Historically, only serotypes EHDV-1 and EHDV-2 have been found in North America, but recent research has discovered at least one more in the Midwest and Southern United States. EHDV can only be spread by an insect vector. In North America, the common vector is the biting midge (Culicoides variipennis). The first identified outbreak of EHDV in the United States in 1955 caused several hundred white-tailed deer to die in New Jersey and Michigan. Cases of EHDV-like die-offs have been reported prior to 1955 (as far back as 1890), but EHDV was not identified in these cases, as its existence was not yet known.

== Viral classification ==
Epizootic hemorrhagic disease virus belongs to the order Reovirales, an order of double-stranded RNA viruses that includes familiar genera Rotavirus (the most common cause of viral gastroenteritis in children), Coltivirus (causative agent of Colorado tick fever), and Orbivirus. Besides EHDV and BTV, other orbiviruses include equine encephalosis virus and African horse sickness virus.

== Genome and structure ==
Epizootic hemorrhagic disease virus's genome is about 18-31 kDa in length and consists of 10 segments, where each segment encodes a single protein. These proteins could be one of the seven structural proteins (VP1-VP7) or one of the four non-structural proteins (NS1, NS2, NS3a, or NS3b). The nonstructural proteins are encoded by gene segments 6, 8, and 10, and have been found to be highly conserved. The segmented genome of EHDV facilitates reassortment within species, and may be why EHDV breakouts occur every year.

The virion outer layer is composed primarily of VP2 and VP5 trimers that are also involved in the virus's ability to attach to and penetrate a host cell. The outer core layer is formed by VP7, which provides a surface for VP2 and VP5 attachment, while the inner subcore layer is formed by VP3. The VP3 inner subcore layer self-assembles to control the size and organization of the capsid structure. The VP3 layer surrounds VP1, VP4, and VP6, in addition to the 10 linear double-stranded RNA segments.

Eight serotypes of EHDV are proposed. Serotypes EHDV-1 (New Jersey strain) and EHDV-2 (Alberta strain) are the dominant forms of EHDV in the U.S., except for in 2012, when an outbreak of EHDV-6 accounted for 63% of the collected isolates from moribund or dead white-tailed deer in the environment. EHDV-6 is thought to be a hybrid form where each of the collected type-6 viruses were all reassortants containing VP2 and VP5 derived from an exotic EHDV-6, while the remaining structural and nonstructural proteins were obtained from the indigenous EHDV-2. EHDV-6 was originally described as originating from Australia, but it has been recognized as an emerging pathogen among cattle in several countries, and is now being considered as an endemic strain in certain parts of the U.S.

== Interaction with the host and associated diseases ==
Epizootic hemorrhagic disease virus must be transmitted via bites from Culicoides gnats (C. verripennis) and cannot be transmitted directly from deer to deer. EHDV manifests itself as epizootic hemorrhagic disease (EHD), which has similar symptoms to adenovirus hemorrhagic disease (AHD), “bluetongue” disease, and malignant catarrhal fever. Instead of being spread by a vector like EHDV, AHD is spread from animal to animal by direct contact and bodily fluids. EHDV is also antigenically different from “bluetongue” disease but the clinical signs of each disease are very similar. EHDV causes deer to lose their fear of humans and causes weakness, excessive salivation, bloody diarrhea, fever, rapid pulse and rapid respiration rate. Hemorrhage and lack of oxygen in the blood results in a blue appearance of the oral mucosa. Bodies of infected deer are frequently found in bodies of water, where they laid down in an attempt to lower their body temperature before becoming unconscious and dying. These symptoms develop about 7 days after the animal was exposed to the virus and 8–36 hours after the onset of initial observable signs; deer progress into a shock-like state, collapse and die.

Examinations of infected deer suggest the virus interferes with normal blood circulation and normal blood clotting mechanisms. The characteristic hemorrhaging of all EHDV victims is caused by an interference with blood clotting mechanisms along with the degeneration of blood vessel walls in many organs and tissues throughout the body. Any alteration in the proteins such as fibrin that render them incapable of causing platelets to gather in a clot along a broken area of blood vessel wall will result in excessive bleeding outside of that vessel. All of this blood leaving blood vessels creates the hemorrhaging associated with this disease. Increased pericardial fluid and generalized edema consistently found in all cases of EHDV strongly suggest its interference with the normal circulation of blood.

Since EHDV is transmitted by gnats, livestock can be exposed to the virus, as well. So far, livestock that have been exposed to this disease rarely show signs of infection. In cases where livestock have shown clinical symptoms, they are usually limited to symptoms such as fever, loss of appetite, lameness, and ulcers and crusty sores on the nose, mouth, and teats.

Ibaraki virus, which is a strain of EHDV serotype 2, causes Ibaraki disease in cattle in Japan.

== Tropism ==
Studies investigating the transmission of the disease have found that it can be transmitted to susceptible deer by inoculating them with infected material from diseased deer by subcutaneous, intramuscular, intravenous, or oral routes in experimental settings. The specific tissues and organs that show hemorrhaging from EHDV vary animal to animal. The most common ones include the heart, liver, spleen, kidney, lung, and intestinal tract. Virus samples can be isolated from many kinds of tissues from infected animals, including blood, liver, spleen, kidney, lung, heart, and other muscles.

== Entry ==
Infecting viral particles are able to enter the cell via an endosmal route. The believed mechanism for this has to do with an acidification of the endosome, similar to what is done in the influenza virus. Early acidification of the endosome is thought to release components from the virus core. These components are then released into the host cell cytoplasm. VP5 often catalyzes cell fusion, which facilitates the penetration of the endosomal membrane and consequently the release of outer capsid components. ALthough EHDV does not contain large concentrations of VP5, it is still able to infect cell systems. EHDV is able to be infectious due to the presence of VP7 as suggested by the binding of anti-bodies to the outer core protein VP7. The binding of EHDV to the cell surface via interaction of VP7 with glycosaminoglycans in addition to other receptors is the most probable entry mechanism.

== Replication and transmission ==
Because EHDV is a double-stranded RNA virus, it needs to overcome a specific set of problems, the main one being the fact that double-stranded RNA is unable to be used as template strand during mRNA translation using host cell machinery. Therefore, EHDV must bring its own transcription enzymes into the cell, to survive and synthesize viral RNA and proteins. However, antiviral defense mechanisms are able to easily recognize and eliminate naked double-stranded RNA in the cell. The presence of the double-stranded RNA would trigger antiviral mechanisms such as apoptosis and interferon production. In order to bypass these host defenses, double-stranded RNA viruses such as EHDV “hide” their genome and other translation machinery within closed protein capsids. These capsids are then delivered into the host cell cytoplasm, where they initiate transcription. The removal of viral proteins VP5 and VP2 during cell entry facilitates the transcription functions of the core, which allows EHDV to synthesize and cap full-length mRNA copies of up to 10 genome segments while they are still safely packaged with in the core.

== Release ==
EHDV genome is assembled within the EHDV subcore, and core particles are assembled within protein capsids inside the cytoplasm of infected cells. The release of EHDV occurs through two main mechanisms: the common viral pathway of budding and by direct cell membrane penetration. The latter damages the cell, often leading to cell lysis. Budding is mediated by NS3.
