= Kemerovo tickborne viral fever =

Kemerovo virus

Virus classification
- (unranked): Virus
- Realm: Riboviria
- Kingdom: Orthornavirae
- Phylum: Duplornaviricota
- Class: Resentoviricetes
- Order: Reovirales
- Family: Sedoreoviridae
- Genus: Orbivirus
- Species: Great Island virus
- Virus: Kemerovo virus

Species of virus

Kemerovo tickborne viral fever is an aparalytic febrile illness accompanied by meningism following tick-bite. The causative agent is a zoonotic Orbivirus first described in 1963 in western Siberia by Mikhail Chumakov and coworkers. The virus has some 23 serotypes, and can occur in coinfections with other Orbiviruses and tick-transmitted encephalitis viruses, complicating the course of illness. Rodents and birds are the primary vertebrate hosts of the virus; Ixodes persulcatus ticks are a vector of the virus. Kemerovo and related viruses may be translocated distances in the environment by migratory birds.
