= Above Maiden virus =

Virus classification
- (unranked): Virus
- Realm: Riboviria
- Kingdom: Orthornavirae
- Phylum: Duplornaviricota
- Class: Resentoviricetes
- Order: Reovirales
- Family: Sedoreoviridae
- Genus: Orbivirus
- Species: Great Island virus
- Strain: Above Maiden virus

Virus serotype

The Above Maiden virus (ABMV) is a serotype of Great Island virus in the genus Orbivirus. It should not be confused with Maiden virus (MDNV) which is a different strain of Great Island virus.
