= Orungo virus =

Virus classification
- (unranked): Virus
- Realm: Riboviria
- Kingdom: Orthornavirae
- Phylum: Duplornaviricota
- Class: Resentoviricetes
- Order: Reovirales
- Family: Sedoreoviridae
- Genus: Orbivirus
- Species: Orbivirus orungoense

Species of virus

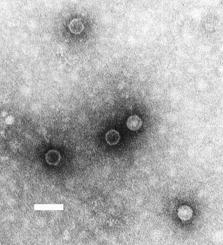
A microscopic photo of a molecule of Orungo Virus

Orungo virus (ORUV) is an arbovirus of the genus Orbivirus and the family Sedoreoviridae. There are four known subtypes of Orungo virus designated Orungo-1 (ORUV-1), Orungo-2 (ORUV-2), Orungo-3 (ORUV-3), and Orungo-4 (ORUV-4). It was first isolated by the Uganda Virus Research Institute in Entebbe, Uganda by Oyewale Tomori and colleagues on the 14^{th} August, 1984. Antibodies to the virus have been found in humans, monkeys, sheep, and cattle. The virus is inactivated at temperatures of 37^{o}C and above and is stable in a pH range of 5.0-7.0.

== Symptoms ==
The disease is a febrile disease that has had over 60 reported cases which have caused the following symptoms: fever; headache; myalgia; vomiting and conjunctival inflammation.

== Geographical distribution ==
The virus itself has been found in patients in Uganda, Nigeria, the Central African Republic, Senegal and the Ivory Coast. However antigens for the disease have also been detected in Sierra Leone, but the virus has not been yet.
