= Acado virus =

Virus classification
- (unranked): Virus
- Realm: Riboviria
- Kingdom: Orthornavirae
- Phylum: Duplornaviricota
- Class: Resentoviricetes
- Order: Reovirales
- Family: Sedoreoviridae
- Genus: Orbivirus
- Species: Corriparta virus
- Serotype: Acado virus

Serotype of Corriparta virus

The Acado virus (ACDV) is a serotype of Corriparta virus in the genus Orbivirus in the Corriparta serogroup. It is isolated from Culex antennatus and C. univittatus neavi in Ethiopia, and not reported to cause disease in humans.
