= Equine encephalosis virus =

- Equine encephalosis virus virion particles

Virus classification
- (unranked): Virus
- Realm: Riboviria
- Kingdom: Orthornavirae
- Phylum: Duplornaviricota
- Class: Resentoviricetes
- Order: Reovirales
- Family: Sedoreoviridae
- Genus: Orbivirus
- Species: Orbivirus betaequi

Species of virus

Equine encephalosis virus (EEV) is a species of virus the Orbivirus genus, and a member of the Sedoreoviridae family, related to African horse sickness virus (AHSV) and Bluetongue virus (BTV).

First described in South Africa over a hundred years ago by Arnold Theiler, EEV is the causative agent of equine encephalosis (EE), an arthropod-borne disease transmitted by the Culicoides spp. midges affecting all equids. Since then the disease has become both widespread and prevalent, taking on epidemic proportions in certain parts of the country. Serological studies estimated a presence of anti-EEV antibodies in over 75% of all South African horses.

Prior to 2008, Equine encephalosis virus had been identified and isolated only in South Africa, where seven antigenetically distinct serotypes, EEV1-7, have been characterised. In 2009, the outbreak of a febrile horse disease across Israel, later diagnosed as EEV, caused great concern primarily due to the similarity of EEV with the African horse sickness virus, one of the most devastating equine pathogens.

== Clinical signs ==
The name equine encephalosis is misleading as the disease is not primarily a neurological disorder. Although the majority of infections result only in mild clinical signs, in more severe cases clinical signs include a short period (typically two to five days) of fluctuating fever, accompanied by varying degrees of inappetence. Elevated heart and respiratory rates are also common, and occasionally as a result of nasal congestion, a red-brown discolouration of the mucous membranes may be observed.

Although rare, more severe clinical signs may occur including facial swelling (lips and eyelids), respiratory distress, and petechial haemorrhages of the conjunctivae. Pregnant mares may also abort during their first 5 months of gestation.

Neurological signs are atypical, but in certain cases hindquarter ataxia, convulsions, hyperexcitability, and depression have been reported. The mortality rate is normally low, accounting for only 5% of infected animals.

== Structure and genome ==
Equine encephalosis virus is an Orbivirus, and as such encodes 4 non-structural and 7 structural proteins derived from 10 linear dsRNA genome segments. The smallest of those genome segments, segment-10, encodes the NS3 protein, which allows the release of the viral particles from the infected cell. The second largest of those segments in turn codes for one of the outer capsid proteins, VP(2).

By analogy with Bluetongue virus, both these proteins may then be used to determine the serotype of EEV, of which seven have been identified to date. This is achieved by analysing the interaction between VP(2), and the antibodies generated by the host during infection. The sequence variation between the proteins is then associated with various viral serotypes.

== Epidemiology ==
First isolated in 1967, Equine encephalosis virus appeared until recently to be unique to the South African equidae. As of 2008 however, evidence seems to suggest the virus has circulated beyond southern Africa, and outbreaks have been reported in a number of other countries including Israel, Ethiopia, Ghana, and Gambia. Intriguingly, Morocco remains free of the epidemic, suggesting the Sahara desert may be acting as a natural barrier to the progression of the disease. Such a progression is of major concern to the worldwide livestock industry, primarily due to the similarity between EEV and other more devastating equid pathogens, such as the African horse sickness virus.

As with all vector-borne diseases, EEV is not transmissible from host-to-host, rather infection requires another intermediate organism that will transmit the pathogen. In the case of Equine encephalosis virus, the transmission occurs via the Culicoides midges during a blood meal.

Several studies have shown that between 50 and 75% of South African equids (notably horses, donkeys and zebras) are seropositive for EEV or have anti-EEV antibodies indicating a prior infection, with serotype 1 being the most prevalent. Antibodies have also occasionally been reported in elephants.

== Treatment and prevention ==
=== Drug therapy ===
In the vast majority of cases (c. 90%) the animal will recover without further complications, and a course of anti-inflammatories or appetite stimulants may be administered. Occasionally, antibiotics are prescribed in order to prevent the appearance of secondary infections. Some equids show no clinical signs at all but are biliary carriers. Although in this instance the animal is not in immediate danger, it must be treated in order to prevent the reemergence of the virus were the immune system to be challenged by another disease simultaneously.

=== Vector control ===
Due to the absence of an effective vaccine, vector control remains one of the primary methods of prevention. Control of the midges is usually only instigated for domesticated stabled horses, and includes precautionary measures such as the limited use of lights at night, as well as the use of fly repellents and fans.
