= G18P =

RVA/pigeon-wt/AUS/VIC/2016/G18P(17)

Virus classification
- (unranked): Virus
- Realm: Riboviria
- Kingdom: Orthornavirae
- Phylum: Duplornaviricota
- Class: Resentoviricetes
- Order: Reovirales
- Family: Sedoreoviridae
- Genus: Rotavirus
- Species: Rotavirus A
- Strain: RVA/pigeon-wt/AUS/VIC/2016/G18P(17)

Strain of virus

G18P or RVA/pigeon-wt/AUS/VIC/2016/G18P[17] is a strain of Rotavirus A infecting and killing domestic pigeons. This disease is found in Western Australia, Victoria, and South Australia.
