= Lebombo virus =

Lubombo virus

Virus classification
- (unranked): Virus
- Realm: Riboviria
- Kingdom: Orthornavirae
- Phylum: Duplornaviricota
- Class: Resentoviricetes
- Order: Reovirales
- Family: Sedoreoviridae
- Genus: Orbivirus
- Species: Orbivirus lebomboense

Species of virus

Lubombo virus (LUBV) is an orbivirus that infects vertebrates and culicine mosquitoes, thought to be its arthropod vector. It is classified in the genus Orbivirus and the family Sedoreoviridae. It is studied at biosafety level 2.

== Virion ==
The Lubombo virus virion is a non-enveloped double layer capsid with a diameter of approximately 80 nm for the outer capsid and 60 nm for the inner capsid. The genome it contains is 19200 base pairs long, composed of linear double-stranded RNA in 10 segments. Each virion contains only one genome segment. The genome codes for 11 proteins total.

== Replication ==
In Vero cells and LLC-MK2 cells, Lebombo virus causes lysis; however, it does not cause any cytopathic effect in C6/36 cells. It causes disease in mice.

== Transmission ==
LEBV is thought to be transmitted by mosquitoes in the genus Culicoides. However, it may be transmitted transiently via blood meals, rather than actual infection of the mosquito.

== Human disease ==
One case of Lubombo virus in humans has been reported, in Ibadan, Nigeria. It caused a febrile illness in a child. People with antibodies to Lebombo virus have been found in South Africa and Nigeria.

There is one serotype of LEBV (LEBV-1).

== History ==
Originally isolated in 1956 in Johannesburg, it was first discovered in Aedes circumluteolus, a species of mosquito. Since, it has been isolated in Mansonia africa.
