= Umatilla virus =

Umtailla virus

Virus classification
- (unranked): Virus
- Realm: Riboviria
- Kingdom: Orthornavirae
- Phylum: Duplornaviricota
- Class: Resentoviricetes
- Order: Reovirales
- Family: Sedoreoviridae
- Genus: Orbivirus
- Species: Orbivirus umatillaense

Species of virus

Umatilla virus (UMAV) is a dsRNA virus in the order Reovirales, the family Sedoreoviridae, and the genus Orbivirus. This arbovirus was first isolated in 1969 in Umatilla County, Oregon in a group of Culex pipiens mosquitoes. The viral host is the Passer domesticus bird with the vectors being Culex mosquitoes.

== Virus structure ==
According to the Baltimore classification, Reovirales are in Group III due to their dsRNA genome. This order of viruses have a linear and segmented genomic arrangement and they lack a lipid envelope. Opposed to having a lipid envelope, these viruses pack their genome into a multi-layered capsid; the outer capsid being T=13 and the inner T=2. The family is divided into two families and UMAV belongs to Sedoreoviridae. This family lacks turrets and therefore has a smooth surface.

UMAV is in the genus Orbivirus, which was originally named after its ring shape. The Umatilla virus genome is broken into ten segments with one packaged per virion. The ten segmented genome encodes for 7 major structural proteins and 3 major non-structural.

The UMAV genome is 19,402 bp long, with 5.695% of the genome being non-coding. With UMAV being in the order Reovirales, it is a non-enveloped virus, but the core is around 30 nm in diameter. The ten segments of this linear dsRNA in the virus mostly code for a single viral protein.

== Replication ==
Along with other viruses in the Reovirales order, Umatilla virus replication occurs in the cytoplasm. This virus comes with some of its own replication proteins. Entrance into the host cell occurs through cell receptors endocytosis. This process is due to the interaction with sialic acid on the host. The outer capsid is removed as the virus is entering the host via endocytosis. So that the dsRNA never comes in direct contact with the cytoplasm, early replication occurs in the viral core. Both replication and assembly occur in the cytoplasm of the host cell. Host ribosomes are used to translate the viral RNA into mRNA. Virions self-assemble in they host cell cytoplasm and then exit by budding following host cell death.

== Transmission ==
This virus is transmitted by Culex mosquitoes and is found in Passer domesticus birds.
