= Cardoreovirus =

Virus classification
- (unranked): Virus
- Realm: Riboviria
- Kingdom: Orthornavirae
- Phylum: Duplornaviricota
- Class: Resentoviricetes
- Order: Reovirales
- Family: Sedoreoviridae
- Genus: Cardoreovirus

Genus of viruses

Cardoreovirus is a genus of double-stranded RNA viruses in the family Sedoreoviridae. Crabs serve as natural hosts. The genus contains two species. Diseases associated with this genus include: trembling disease. The name derives from Latin words "carcinus" which means crab and "doeca" which means twelve in reference to the number genome segments.

== Structure ==
Viruses in the genus Cardoreovirus are non-enveloped. They have an icosahedral capsid that is three-layered. The inner shell has T=2 symmetry and the middle shell has T=13 symmetry. The diameter is around 55 nm.

== Genome ==
The genome is made of double-stranded RNA. It is linear and has twelve segments.

== Life cycle ==
Viral replication is cytoplasmic. Entry into the host cell is achieved by attachment to host receptors, which mediates endocytosis. Replication follows the double-stranded RNA virus replication model. Double-stranded RNA virus transcription is the method of transcription. The virus exits the host cell by monopartite non-tubule guided viral movement. Crabs serve as the natural host. Transmission routes are passive diffusion.

== Taxonomy ==
The genus contains the following species, listed by scientific name and followed by the exemplar virus of the species:

- Cardoreovirus callinectes, Callinectes sapidus reovirus 2
- Cardoreovirus eriocheiris, Eriocheir sinensis reovirus
