= Abadina virus =

Virus classification
- (unranked): Virus
- Realm: Riboviria
- Kingdom: Orthornavirae
- Phylum: Duplornaviricota
- Class: Resentoviricetes
- Order: Reovirales
- Family: Sedoreoviridae
- Genus: Orbivirus
- Species: Palyam virus
- Serotype: Abadina virus

Serotype of Palyam virus

The Abadina virus (ABAV) is a serotype of Palyam virus in the genus Orbivirus belonging to the Palyam serogroup. It was considered a distinct species of virus until 1984. The Abadina virus was first detected in 1967 from Culicoides.

The virus is isolated from Culicoides sp.
