= Acatinga virus =

Virus classification
- (unranked): Virus
- Realm: Riboviria
- Kingdom: Orthornavirae
- Phylum: Duplornaviricota
- Class: Resentoviricetes
- Order: Reovirales
- Family: Sedoreoviridae
- Genus: Orbivirus
- Species: Changuinola virus
- Serotype: Acatinga virus

Serotype of Changuinola virus

The Acatinga virus (ACTV) is a serotype of Changuinola virus. ACTV was first isolated from phlebotomine sandflies in the Amazon region of Brazil. This virus have not reported to cause disease in humans.
