= Simon Carpenter =

British entomologist

Simon T. Carpenter
- Education: BSc Royal Holloway, University of London, PhD Aberdeen University
- Known for: Research on Bluetongue virus transmission
- Awards: Rooker Prize
- Scientific career
- Fields: Entomology
- Workplaces: Biotechnology and Biological Sciences Research Council, Institute for Animal Health, Pirbright Laboratory, Woking, Surrey

Dr. Simon Carpenter, Head of the Entomology and Modelling Group in the Vector-borne Diseases Programme at the UK Biotechnology and Biological Sciences Research Council Institute for Animal Health's Pirbright Laboratory in Woking, Surrey, is an entomologist who was awarded the first Rooker Prize in 2009 in recognition of his research on biting midges that transmit bluetongue virus (BTV), the causative agent of bluetongue disease, an important orbivirus disease of ruminants.

Carpenter's field and laboratory research elucidated key details about how bluetongue virus is transmitted, enabling the establishment of "vector-free" and "transmission-free" periods following the first incursion of BTV into Britain in August 2007, which facilitated DEFRA's regulation of animal movements, saving the UK farming industry millions of pounds in trade and preserving thousands of jobs, significantly lessening the impact of BTV.

Carpenter's Entomology and Modelling Group is responsible for maintaining the UK Culicoides reference laboratory, a center of taxonomic excellence whose responsibilities include operating the Culicoides.NET open-access internet facility, http://www.culicoides.net, and coordinating and performing Culicoides population surveys in the UK and overseas. The group has identified new vectors of BTV that were previously thought to be of low epidemiological importance in transmission of the virus, resulting in better risk assessment for BTV and similar diseases in the northern Palaearctic regions.

== Personal ==
Carpenter is a native of London, England. He holds a BSc degree from Royal Holloway College, University of London, and completed his PhD degree at the University of Aberdeen in 2001; his dissertation was on colonisation and dispersal of the Scottish biting midge, Culicoides impunctatus Goetghebuer.
