= Mimoreovirus =

Virus classification
- (unranked): Virus
- Realm: Riboviria
- Kingdom: Orthornavirae
- Phylum: Duplornaviricota
- Class: Resentoviricetes
- Order: Reovirales
- Family: Sedoreoviridae
- Genus: Mimoreovirus

Genus of viruses

Mimoreovirus is a genus of viruses, in the family Sedoreoviridae. The only isolate infects the marine photosynthetic protist Micromonas pusilla, a prasinophyte. There is only one species in this genus: Micromonas pusilla reovirus (Mimoreovirus micromonadis).

== Structure ==
Viruses in Mimoreovirus are non-enveloped, with icosahedral geometries, and T=13, T=2 symmetry. The diameter is around 90-95 nm. Genomes are linear and segmented, around 15.8kb in length. The genome codes for 11 proteins.

Genus	Structure	Symmetry	Capsid	Genomic arrangement	Genomic segmentation
Mimoreovirus	Icosahedral	T=13, T=2	Non-enveloped	Linear	Segmented

== Life cycle ==
Viral replication is cytoplasmic. Entry into the host cell is achieved by attachment to host receptors, which mediates endocytosis. Replication follows the double-stranded RNA virus replication model. Double-stranded RNA virus transcription is the method of transcription. The virus exits the host cell by monopartite non-tubule guided viral movement. Marine photosynthetic protists serve as the natural host. Transmission routes are passive diffusion.

Genus	Host details	Tissue tropism	Entry details	Release details	Replication site	Assembly site	Transmission
Mimoreovirus	Algae	None	Cell receptor endocytosis	Cell death	Cytoplasm	Cytoplasm	Arthropod bite
