= Peruvian horse sickness virus =

Virus classification
- (unranked): Virus
- Realm: Riboviria
- Kingdom: Orthornavirae
- Phylum: Duplornaviricota
- Class: Resentoviricetes
- Order: Reovirales
- Family: Sedoreoviridae
- Genus: Orbivirus
- Species: Orbivirus gammaequi

Serotype
- Peruvian horse sickness virus 1

Species of virus

Peruvian horse sickness virus (PHSV) is a cause of the neurological disorder Peruvian horse sickness resulting in encephalitis in horses and other livestock. The disease has significantly affected livestock in areas of Peru and has also been documented in northern Australia.

== History ==
Peruvian horse sickness was described in 1997 when an unexpected number of deaths in horses occurred during the rainy season in Peru. The cause of death in most affected horses was complications due to encephalitis. One of the viruses collected from horses that died of the disease was named Peruvian horse sickness virus (PHSV). The 1997 outbreak was considered an epizootic outbreak that involved a variety of domestic animals including horses, cattle, donkeys, and sheep. PHSV was also isolated from horses showing similar clinical signs in 1999 in the Northern Territory of Australia, though the Australian isolate was called Elsey virus until it was determined to likely be the same species as PHSV.

== Epidemiology ==
Animals can contract the virus from infected mosquitoes. The virus has been isolated from Aedes serratus, Anopheles albimanus, and Psorophora ferox. The epidemiology of the virus is poorly characterized. Symptoms in horses include fever over 39 °C, anorexia, reduced motor coordination, neck stiffness, teeth grinding, and sagging jaw. Horses typically die 8–11 days after clinical signs present. Approximately 79% of horses that contracted the disease in the 1997 Peru outbreak died, and survivors took about three months to recover.
