= ACTV =

ACTV may refer to:

- File Transfer Protocol#Protocol overview
- Actv S.p.A. (Azienda del Consorzio Trasporti Veneziano), Italian public transit company
- Motoactv, the Motorola ACTV smartwatch
- ACTV Japan, television production company
- Antenne Centre Télévision, a Belgian television station
- Acatinga virus (ACTV)
- Arizona Capital Television, which provides coverage of the Arizona State Legislature
