= Horse sickness =

Horse sickness may refer to:

- African horse sickness
- Peruvian horse sickness
