= Epizootic hemorrhagic disease =

Viral disease of ungulates, especially deer

Epizootic hemorrhagic disease (EHD) is a hemorrhagic disease of white-tailed deer (Odocoileus virginianus) caused by an infection of a virus from the genus Orbivirus subsequently called Epizootic hemorrhagic disease virus (EHDV). It is an infectious, and sometimes fatal, virus that is characterized by extensive hemorrhages, and is found throughout the United States. Large-scale outbreaks in wild ruminants affect livestock and the production industry. EHD has been found in some domestic ruminants and many species of deer including white-tailed deer, mule deer, elk, and pronghorn antelope. Seropositive black-tailed deer, fallow deer, red deer, wapiti, and roe deer have also been found, which essentially means that they were exposed to the disease at some time in the past but may not be involved in transmission. Outbreaks of EHD have been reported in cattle, although they rarely develop disease or die. Sheep may develop clinical signs, but this is also rare. EHD is often called bluetongue, but this is incorrect. Bluetongue virus is closely related to EHDV, and has similar clinical signs, but it is a different disease. Bluetongue is a serious disease in cattle, as well as other ruminants, and can have a significant effect on international trade. Testing at animal health laboratories is necessary to distinguish between the viruses that cause bluetongue and EHD.

== Geographic distribution ==
The distribution of EHD depends greatly on the distribution and abundance of the biting midge (Culicoides variipennis), the level of existing immunity in deer, and the genetic variations in susceptibility. EHD is found in North America, Australia, Asia, the Middle East and Africa. Seropositive animals have also been found in South America. It occurs most often in the Southern United States, although its distribution is not uniform. In the south, the disease is characterized as frequent and mild, whereas in the north, the disease is characterized as infrequent, severe, and capable of high mortality. Researchers in 2003 found that fawns of northern subspecies of white-tailed deer infected with EHDV developed severe clinical symptoms while southern subspecies had mild or nondetectable disease suggesting geographic differences in innate resistance or maternal antibodies. Researchers also found that maternal antibodies against EHDV could be detected in Georgia deer up to 18 weeks, and seropositive fawns showed minimal clinical evidence of disease while seronegative fawns exhibited mild to moderate clinical signs of disease. EHD can occur throughout Indiana and other parts of the midwestern United States where the disease can be characterized by both significant outbreaks that occur on a 5- to 10-year cycle that affect the entire state and smaller outbreaks that may only involve a few counties.

== Transmission ==
Transmission of EHD occurs by a host being bitten by a virus-carrying fly or midge. Many different species of culicoides can carry this virus, but the most common carrier is thought to be Culicoides variipennis. EHD can only be transmitted by a vector, meaning it cannot be transmitted from animal to animal, but only through the initial bite by a vector. Ordinarily, EHD outbreaks reoccur within an area primarily during seasonal dry spells. Outbreaks typically result in large die-offs, and smaller and more isolated outbreaks can be common.

The midge larvae hatch and live near the water's edge in the bank. They grow and typically remain in the submerged mud in water that is less than 2 inches deep. They continue to live in eutrophic areas, as these areas provide the highest likelihood of survival for the larvae and the midge as it matures. The midges do not survive long after the first seasonal frost.

== Clinical signs ==
Deer may become infected with peracute, acute, or chronic EHD infections. They can develop clinical signs in as few as seven days after exposure, and this is most constantly characterized by sudden onset of the disease. In general, deer infected with EHD lose their appetite, lose their fear of people, grow weak, show excessive salivation, develop a rapid pulse, have a rapid respiration rate, show signs of a fever, which includes lying in bodies of water to reduce their body temperature, become unconscious, and have a blue tongue from the lack of oxygen in the blood. The heads and necks of infected deer may swell. One of the most common characteristics of deer with the chronic form of EHD is the sloughing or breaking of the hooves caused by growth interruptions. Deer with chronic EHD often become lame due to these hoof problems. Although they are ill for several weeks, they can eventually recover. Deer with the peracute form of the disease may go into shock 8–36 hours after the onset of symptoms and soon die. Death is also common in deer with acute EHD, which is generally comparable to peracute EHD and is characterized by excessive salivation, nasal discharge, and hemorrhaging of the skin. Cattle that develop EHD typically have subclinical signs. These infections are less severe than the infections in deer, but they may still exhibit fever, oral ulcers, excessive salivation, lameness, and coronitis (inflammation of the coronary band in hoofed animal). Sheep rarely develop clinical signs, and experimentally infected goats have never been shown to exhibit any signs of EHD. Typically, EHD does not kill livestock, but it may affect the production industry negatively because of effects from the disease such as cattle weight loss and lameness.

== Prevention and control ==
=== Protection of livestock stables ===
Reducing midges around livestock stables is a good way of reducing the likelihood of disease transmission. To "midge-proof" a stable, several precautions must be taken. One way to reduce entry of midges into the stable is to add screens with very fine mesh. Although mesh significantly reduces the entrance of midges, it is not 100% "midge-proof" on its own. In addition to the mesh screen, fans can be placed strategically in the stable. Fans are effective in reducing midges because of their small size and poor flying capabilities. Removing breeding pools around livestock is also essential. Midges can breed in pools as small as a hoofprint. Providing a substrate that is well-drained and resists the formation of pools can prevent midges from breeding.

=== Consumption of Infected Animals ===
EHD has been shown to not affect humans, and no evidence has been found that the epizootic hemorrhagic disease can be contracted through midge bites or by consuming venison that has been infected with the virus. EHD is exclusive to ruminants, and no cases have been reported of nonruminants exhibiting signs or symptoms that are linked to EHD. Once EHD is contracted, the likelihood of other diseases being contracted increases. As a result of the additional exposure to other infections, consuming venison from animals that are visibly sick is not recommended. Animals that are sick may show obvious signs of extreme fatigue and illness, such as rapid weight loss or lesions or abscesses across the body. Other signs include foaming or frothing of the nose and mouth (similar to rabies), as well as the decay of walls of their hooves.

=== Farmed or captive deer ===
Currently, no vaccines for EHD are available. Spraying land with insecticides or larvicides could also decrease the risk of transmission.

=== Management of breeding sites ===
Because midges breed in water, management of breeding sites is the best way to reduce their numbers, though this may not be practical in areas with lakes or ponds. However, preventive actions include stopping troughs from overflowing, making sure pipes are not leaking, and removing any standing pools of water. Reducing standing water greatly reduces midge populations in a given area.

== History ==
Epizootic hemorrhagic disease has been around for many years. EHD is thought to have been first found and tracked back to around 1890, and has been responsible for die-offs of many different species across North America. Diseases such as blackleg, blacktongue, bluetongue, mycotic stomatitis, or hemorrhagic septicemia were thought to have been the cause of many of these die-offs. After further analysis, the true causative agent was never confirmed. After further review of the case history and other telltale signs and lesions, seasonal occurrence, and lack of a bacterial agent suggest that they might have been EHD. Current research is focused on the elucidation of mechanisms governing differences in response to EHDV among populations of white-tailed deer. Direct experiments have suggested that regional differences in response to EHDV may be tied to differences in maternal antibodies and innate resistance to EHDV between northern and southern subspecies of deer. Researchers in 2023 found that two single nucleotide polymorphisms had significant differences in frequency between EHD-positive and EHD-negative deer, suggesting a genetic component in susceptibility to EHDV.
