= ABAV =

ABAV may refer to:

- ABAV, a relay station of ABV, the former local channel of Australian Broadcasting Corporation in Melbourne
- Abadina virus, a serotype of Palyam virus
