= Bluetongue disease =

Viral disease in animals

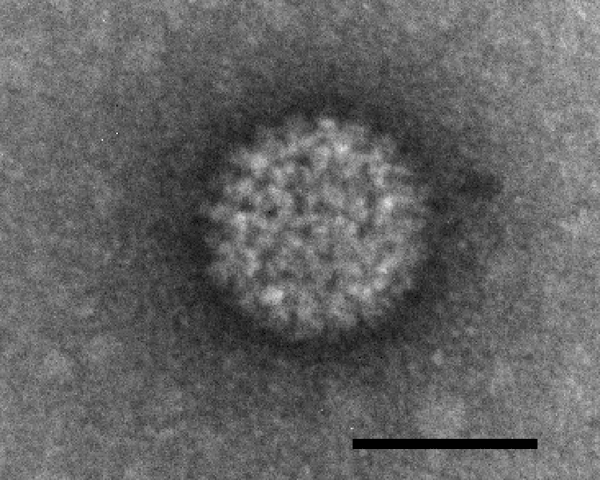
Electron micrograph of Bluetongue virus, scale bar = 50 nm

Bluetongue (BT) disease is a noncontagious, arthropod-borne viral disease affecting ruminants, primarily sheep and other domestic or wild ruminants, including cattle, yaks, goats, buffalo, deer, dromedaries, and antelope. It is caused by bluetongue virus (BTV), a nonenveloped, double-stranded RNA virus belonging to the genus Orbivirus within the family Sedoreoviridae. The virus is mainly transmitted by biting midges, specifically Culicoides species (e.g. Culicoides imicola, C. oxystoma, and C. variipennis). BTV has a widespread geographical distribution, encompassing numerous continents and regions, including Africa, Asia, Australia, Europe, North America, and various tropical and subtropical regions. At present, there are more than 28 recognized serotypes of BTV. Bluetongue outbreaks have had a significant economic impact, with estimated annual global losses reaching around US$3 billion.

== Clinical signs ==
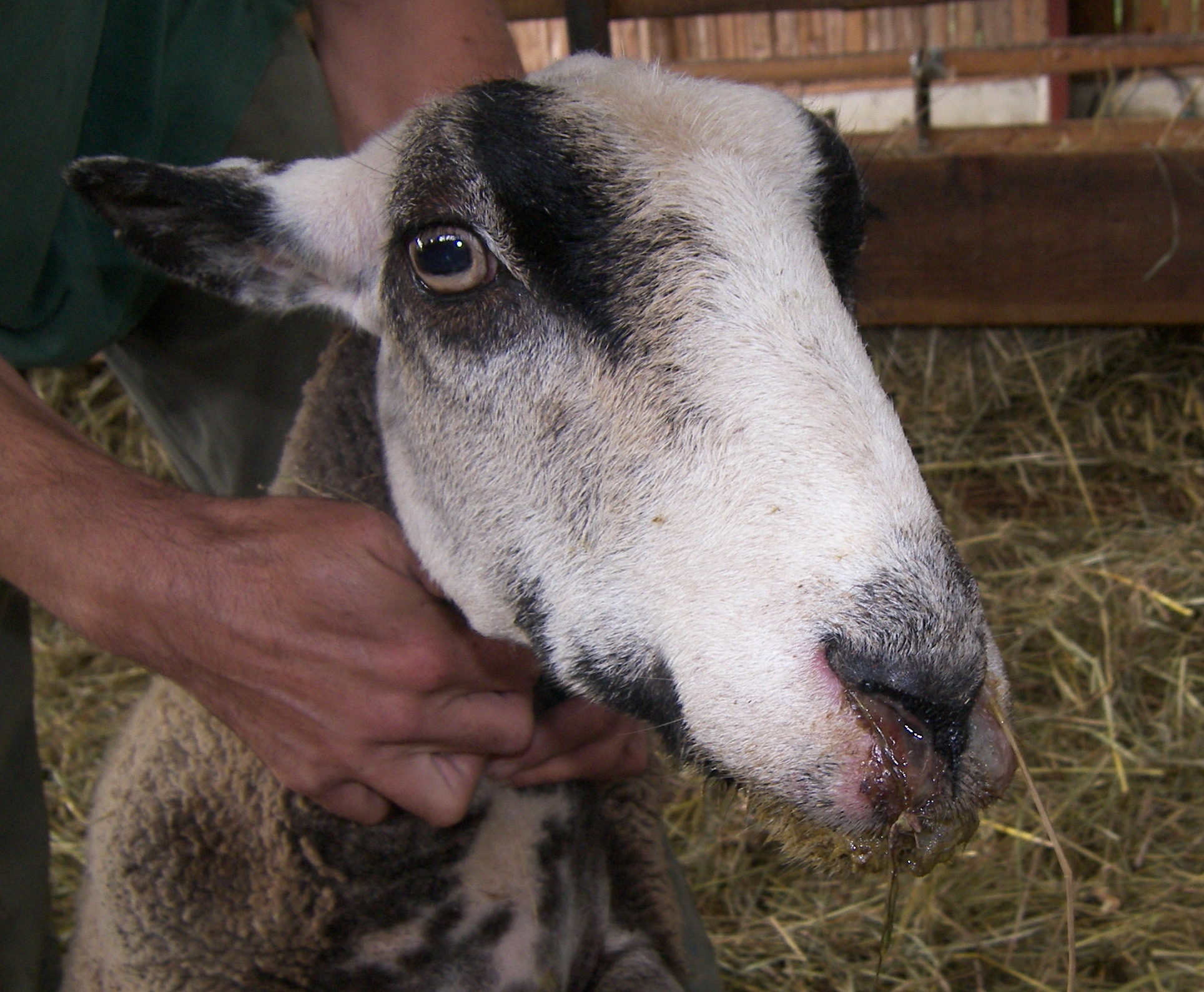
Infected sheep

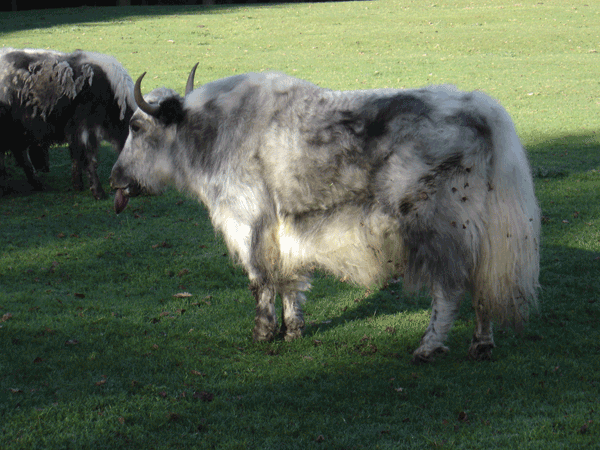
A domestic yak is infected with bluetongue virus: The tongue is swollen, cyanotic, and protruding from the mouth.

In sheep, BTV causes an acute disease with high morbidity and mortality. BTV also infects goats, cattle, and other domestic animals, as well as wild ruminants (for example, blesbok, white-tailed deer, elk, and pronghorn). The clinical signs are summarized under the term FFF (fever, face, feet).

Major signs are high fever, excessive salivation, swelling of the face and tongue, and cyanosis (in severe conditions) of the tongue. Swelling of the lips and tongue gives the tongue its typical blue appearance, though this sign is confined to a minority of the animals. Nasal signs may be prominent, with nasal discharge and stertorous respiration.

Some animals also develop foot lesions, beginning with coronitis, with consequent lameness. In sheep, this can lead to knee-walking. In cattle, constant changing of position of the feet gives bluetongue the nickname the "dancing disease". Torsion of the neck (opisthotonos or torticollis) is observed in severely affected animals.

Not all animals develop signs, but all those that do lose condition rapidly, and the sickest die within a week. For affected animals that do not die, recovery is very slow, lasting several months.

The incubation period is 5–20 days, and all signs usually develop within a month. The mortality rate is normally low, but it is high in susceptible breeds of sheep. In Africa, local breeds of sheep may have no mortality, but in imported breeds, it may be up to 90%.

The manifestation of clinical signs in cattle is contingent upon the strain of virus. BTV-8 has been documented to cause a severe disease state and mortality in cattle. The current circulation of BTV-3 in Northern Europe is epidemiologically noteworthy due to the presentation of clinical signs in cattle and a higher sheep mortality rate than that observed with BTV-8. Other ruminants, such as goats, typically exhibit minimal or no clinical signs despite high viral levels in blood. Therefore, they could serve as potential virus reservoirs of BTV. Red deer are an exception, as the disease may be as acute as in sheep.

Lambs infected in utero can develop congenital hydranencephaly, a condition in which the brain's cerebral hemispheres are like Swiss cheese, or absent, and replaced by sacs filled with cerebrospinal fluid. Ewes infected with bluetongue virus while pregnant can have lambs with this defect, as well as giving birth to lambs that are small, weak, deformed, or blind. These affected lambs die within a few days of birth, or are stillborn.

== Microbiology ==
Bluetongue is caused by the pathogenic vector-borne RNA virus, bluetongue virus (BTV), of the genus Orbivirus within the Sedoreoviridae family. The virus particle consists of 10 strands of double-stranded RNA surrounded by two protein shells. Unlike other arboviruses, BTV lacks a lipid envelope. The virus exhibits icosahedral symmetry, with a diameter around 80–90 nm. The structure of the 70 nm core was determined in 1998 and was at the time the largest atomic structure to be solved.

The 10 viral genome segments have been found to encode seven structural (VP1–VP7) and five nonstructural (NS1, NS2, NS3/NS3A, NS4 and NS5) proteins. Currently, more than 28 known serotypes of BTV are known. The sequence of genome Seg-2 and its translated protein VP2, as well as that of Seg-6 and its translated protein VP5, exhibit variations that determine the serotypes.

The two outer capsid proteins, VP2 and VP5, mediate attachment and penetration of BTV into the target cell. VP2 and VP5 are the primary antigenic targets for antibody targeting by the host immune system. The virus makes initial contact with the cell with VP2, triggering receptor-mediated endocytosis of the virus. The low pH within the endosome then triggers BTV's membrane penetration protein VP5 to undergo a conformational change that disrupts the endosomal membrane. Uncoating yields a transcriptionally active 470S core particle which is composed of two major proteins VP7 and VP3, and the three minor proteins VP1, VP4 and VP6 in addition to the dsRNA genome. There is no evidence that any trace of the outer capsid remains associated with these cores, as has been described for reovirus. The cores may be further uncoated to form 390S subcore particles that lack VP7, also in contrast to reovirus. Subviral particles are probably akin to cores derived in vitro from virions by physical or proteolytic treatments that remove the outer capsid and cause activation of the BTV transcriptase. In addition to the seven structural proteins, three nonstructural (NS) proteins, NS1, NS2, NS3 (and a related NS3A) are synthesised in BTV-infected cells. Of these, NS3/NS3A is involved in the egress of the progeny virus. The two remaining nonstructural proteins are produced at high levels in the cytoplasm and are believed to be involved in virus replication, assembly, and morphogenesis.

== Evolution ==
The viral genome is replicated via structural protein VP1, an RNA-dependent RNA polymerase. The lack of proof-reading abilities results in high levels of transcription errors, resulting in single nucleotide mutations. Despite this, the BTV genome is quite stable, exhibiting a low rate of variants arising in populations. Evidence suggests this is due to purifying selection across the genome, as the virus is transmitted alternately through its insect and animal hosts. However, individual gene segments undergo different selective pressures and some, particularly segments 4 and 5, are subject to positive selection.

The BTV genome exhibits rapid evolution through genetic drift, reassortment of genome segments (genetic shift), and intragenic recombination. This evolutionary process, in conjunction with the random fixation of quasispecies variants during transmission between susceptible animals and vectors, is postulated to be the primary driver of the genetic diversity observed in BTV field strains. Reassortment can lead to a rapid shift in phenotypes independent of the slow rate of mutation. During this process, gene segments are not randomly reassorted. Rather, there appears to be a mechanism for selecting for or against certain segments from the parental serotypes present. However, this selective mechanism is still poorly understood.

To date, BTV serotypes 25 and above have been identified as the causative agents of infection in small ruminants. The infection is subclinical, which likely explains why these serotypes, which are less or nonvirulent, have not been identified earlier through laboratory diagnostic studies. BTV serotypes 25 and higher notably are transmitted without midges, indicating that direct contact between sheep or goats may be a potential mode of transfer.

== Epidemiology ==
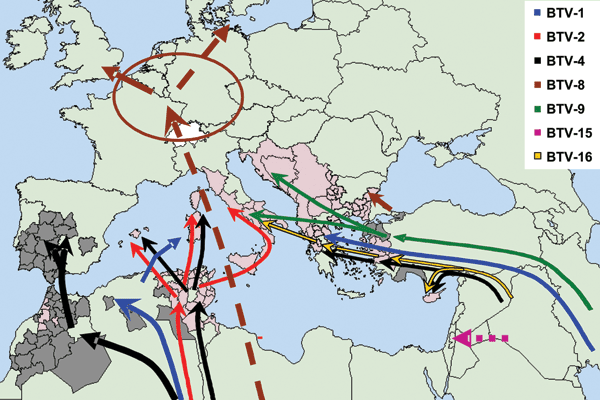
The molecular epidemiology of bluetongue virus in Europe since 1998: Routes of introduction of different serotypes and individual virus strains

The presence of the insect vectors determines the bluetongue disease's global distribution, with regions in Africa, Asia, Australia, Europe, North America, and other tropical/subtropical area being most affected.

The virus persists in areas where climatic conditions support the survival of Culicoides midges during winter. This adaptability allows the disease to establish itself in new regions when conditions become favorable.

An illustrated outline of the transmission cycle of BTV is available in Parasitic flies of domestic animals.

Its occurrence is seasonal in the affected Mediterranean countries, subsiding when temperatures drop and hard frosts kill the adult midge vectors. Viral survival and vector longevity is seen during milder winters. A significant contribution to the northward spread of bluetongue disease has been the ability of C. obsoletus and C.pulicaris to acquire and transmit the pathogen, both of which are spread widely throughout Europe. This is in contrast to the original C.imicola vector, which is limited to North Africa and the Mediterranean. The relatively recent novel vector has facilitated a far more rapid spread than the simple expansion of habitats north through global warming.

In August 2006, cases of bluetongue were found in the Netherlands, then Belgium, Germany, and Luxembourg. In 2007, the first case of bluetongue in the Czech Republic was detected in one bull near Cheb at the Czech–German border. In September 2007, the UK reported its first ever suspected case of the disease, in a Highland cow on a rare-breeds farm near Ipswich, Suffolk. Since then, the virus has spread from cattle to sheep in Britain. By October 2007, bluetongue had become a serious threat in Scandinavia and Switzerland and the first outbreak in Denmark was reported. In autumn 2008, several cases were reported in the southern Swedish provinces of Småland, Halland, and Skåne, as well as in areas of the Netherlands bordering Germany, prompting veterinary authorities in Germany to intensify controls. Norway had its first finding in February 2009, when cows at two farms in Vest-Agder in the south of Norway showed an immune response to bluetongue. A number of countries, including Norway and Finland, were certified as free of the disease in 2011 and 2021, respectively.

In 2023, Europe witnessed a series of notable epizootic occurrences at higher latitudes, partially attributable to the emergence of a novel serotype, BTV-3. The serotype was first identified in the Netherlands in September 2023 and has since been documented in numerous European countries, including Belgium, Germany, France, Spain, the UK, Norway, and Sweden.

Although the disease is not a threat to humans, the most vulnerable common domestic ruminants are cattle, goats, and especially sheep.

=== Overwintering ===
A puzzling aspect of BTV is its survival between midge seasons in temperate regions. Adults of Culicoides are killed by cold winter temperatures, and BTV infections typically do not last for more than 60 days, which is not long enough for BTV to survive until the next spring. The virus is believed to somehow survive in overwintering midges or animals. Multiple mechanisms have been proposed. A few adult Culicoides midges infected with BTV may survive the mild winters of the temperate zone. Some midges may even move indoors to avoid the cold temperature of the winter. Additionally, BTV could cause a chronic or latent infection in some animals, providing another means for BTV to survive the winter. BTV can also be transmitted from mother to fetus. The outcome is abortion or stillbirth if fetal infection occurs early in gestation and survival if infection occurs late. Infection at an intermediate stage, though, before the fetal immune system is fully developed, may result in a chronic infection that lingers until the first months after birth of the lamb. Midges then spread the pathogen from the lambs to other animals, starting a new season of infection.

=== Climate change ===
The spread of bluetongue to Southern, Central, and Northern Europe provides an illustrative example of the complex interactions between climate change, vector habitat suitability, animal population density, distribution, and movement, which collectively influence the patterns of disease emergence and transmission.

Traditionally, Culicoides imicola has been found in subtropical Asia and Africa. However, due to climate change, they have spread all the way to Europe and as far as Sweden. The increase in temperature has positively impacted C. imicola distribution, which has raised concern in the spread of disease across central Europe as the flies make their way northward. Without a significant improvement in epidemiological control measures, what is currently considered a once-in-20-years outbreak of bluetongue would occur as frequently as once in five or seven years by midcentury under all but the most optimistic climate change scenario.

== Treatment and prevention ==
Currently, no antiviral medications have been approved for the treatment of bluetongue disease. The standard of care involves the administration of anti-inflammatory drugs and supportive nursing care to alleviate the clinical signs and symptoms. Prevention is effected via quarantine, vaccination, and control of the midge vectors, including inspection of aircraft. The recurrent emergence of novel strains and the occurrence of new outbreaks with significant socioeconomic impacts highlight the urgent need for effective antiviral strategies. The current vaccines for BTV are serotype-specific, which limits their utility and has led to interest in host-targeted antiviral strategies that offer broader activity against multiple serotypes and a reduced risk of resistance development.

=== Livestock management and insect control ===
Some available key measures include vector control, such as the use of insecticides, insect-proof nets, and improved housing to reduce exposure to biting midges. Additionally, the removal of infected animals helps prevent further transmission by reducing the number of viremic hosts, while movement restrictions—including quarantines and health certifications—prevent the introduction of the virus to uninfected regions.

=== Vaccines ===
Vaccination still represents an effective strategy for protecting ruminants against bluetongue, but this is only possible with a vaccine that is effective against the relevant serotype. The most prevalent vaccines are live attenuated vaccines and killed or inactivated vaccines. Other potential vaccines include subunit vaccines, virus-like particles, DNA vaccines, disabled infectious single-animal vaccines, and disabled infectious single-cycle vaccines.

Protection by live attenuated vaccines (LAVs) are serotype specific. Multiserotype LAV cocktails can induce neutralizing antibodies against unincluded serotypes, and subsequent vaccinations with three different pentavalent LAV cocktails induce broad protection. These pentavalent cocktails contain 15 different serotypes in total: serotypes 1 through 14 and 19.

Immunization with any of the available vaccines, though, precludes later serological monitoring of affected cattle populations, a problem that could be resolved using next-generation subunit vaccines.

In January 2015, the vaccine Raksha Blu was launched in India. It is designed to protect livestock against five strains of the bluetongue virus.

The vaccine Syvazul BTV was authorized for veterinary use in the European Union in January 2019.

In January 2025, the Committee for Veterinary Medicinal Products of the European Medicines Agency adopted a positive opinion, recommending the granting of a marketing authorization for the veterinary medicinal product Bluevac-3, suspension for injection, intended for cattle and sheep. The applicant for this veterinary medicinal product is CZ Vaccines S.A.U. Bluevac-3 is a vaccine containing inactivated bluetongue virus, serotype 3, BTV-3/NET2023 as active substance. The vaccine is intended to stimulate the active immunity of sheep and cattle against bluetongue virus serotype 3. The CVMP also adopted a positive opinion, recommending the granting of a marketing authorization for the veterinary medicinal product Syvazul BTV 3, suspension for injection, intended for sheep. The applicant for this veterinary medicinal product is Laboratorios Syva S.A. Syvazul BTV 3 is a vaccine containing Bluetongue virus, serotype 3, BTV-3/NET2023, inactivated as active substance. It is intended for the active immunization of sheep against bluetongue virus serotype 3.

== History ==
In the early stages of its identification, BT was referred to by a number of different names, including "epizootic catarrh", "fever", "malarial catarrhal fever of sheep", and "epizootic malignant catarrhal fever of sheep". This was due to the prevailing belief at the time that BT was caused by an intraerythrocytic parasite. The English translation "bluetongue" was initially proposed by Spreull and derived from the Afrikaans term bloutong, which refers to the condition of cyanosis of the tongue in clinically affected sheep. Although bluetongue disease was already recognized in South Africa in the early 19th century, a comprehensive description of the disease was not published until the first decade of the 20th century. In 1906, Arnold Theiler showed that bluetongue was caused by a filterable agent. He also created the first bluetongue vaccine, which was developed from an attenuated BTV strain. For many decades, bluetongue was thought to be confined to Africa. The first confirmed outbreak outside of Africa occurred in Cyprus in 1943.

== Related diseases ==
African horse sickness is related to bluetongue and is spread by the same midges (Culicoides species). It can kill the horses it infects, and mortality may go as high as 90% of the infected horses during an epidemic.

Epizootic hemorrhagic disease virus is closely related and crossreacts with bluetongue virus on many blood tests.
