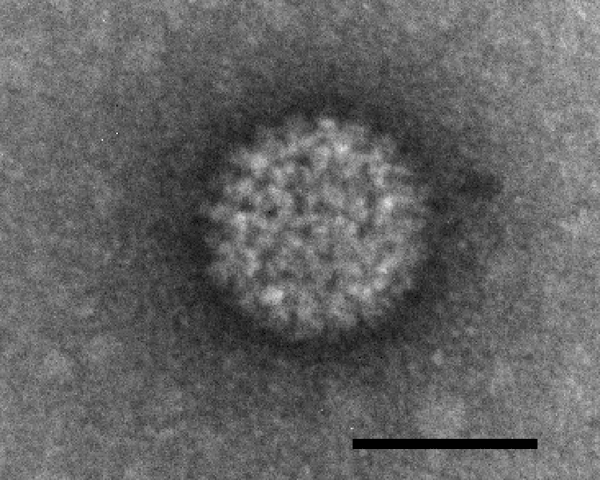
- Electron micrograph of Bluetongue virus, scale bar = 50 nm

Virus classification
- (unranked): Virus
- Realm: Riboviria
- Kingdom: Orthornavirae
- Phylum: Duplornaviricota
- Class: Resentoviricetes
- Order: Reovirales
- Family: Sedoreoviridae
- Genus: Orbivirus
- Species: Orbivirus caerulinguae
- Virus: Bluetongue virus

= Bluetongue virus =

Virus in ruminants

Bluetongue virus (BTV) is a dsRNA virus of the genus Orbivirus. The virus causes bluetongue disease. BTV is relatively fragile and its infectivity is lost in slightly acidic environments.

The BTV-3 variant (BTV-3/NET2023), discovered in the Netherlands in 2023, has raised concerns due to its fast spread in Europe, and the introduction of this variant could pose new challenges for disease control. In response to this, several countries have implemented vaccination campaigns, but the challenge lies in matching vaccines to the circulating strain. The BTV-3 variant’s genetic stability has been confirmed through sequencing, and vaccines currently in use are expected to be effective against it.
