= Culicoides variipennis =

Scientific classification
- Kingdom: Animalia
- Phylum: Arthropoda
- Class: Insecta
- Order: Diptera
- Family: Ceratopogonidae
- Genus: Culicoides
- Subgenus: Monoculicoides
- Species: C. variipennis

Binomial name
- Culicoides variipennis (Coquillett, 1901)

Synonyms
- Ceratopogon variipennis Coquillett, 1901

Species of fly

Culicoides variipennis is a 1 millimetre (0.039 in) long biting midge. It is a part of the subgenus Monoculicoides and has many subspecies. Found in North America, C. variipennis transmits Bluetongue virus, African horse sickness virus, akabane virus, and epizootic hemorrhagic disease.

== Anatomy ==
Culicoides variipennis is less than 1 millimetre (0.039 in) long, which makes it difficult to keep from livestock. The wings of C. variipennis are spotted and narrow with few veins; the wings fold over the abdomen while the C. variipennis is at rest. The max flight range for male C. variipennis is 0.8 kilometres (0.50 mi) and for females 4.0 kilometres (2.5 mi), while the mean flight range is 1.89 kilometres (1.17 mi). Flight activity is dependent on the light intensity and temperature; most flight, and thus most bites, occur around dawn and dusk. A distinction between male and female C. variipennis is that females have different mouthparts that allow them to blood feed.

== Life cycle ==
The life cycle of C. variipennis is from half a year to three years. The larva, found typically near sewage tank outlets, stock tanks and ponds or stream where manure is trampled into the soil, is slender, transparent to orange colored, worm-like and lasts 15–23 days in larval stage. The aquatic/sub aquatic larvae feed on dying organisms or other organic material.

== Subspecies ==
=== Locations ===
Culicoides variipennis and the five subspecies, C. v. variipennis, C. v. sonorensis, C. v. occidentalis, C. v. australis, and C. v. albertensis, are found in various locations of the United States. The C. v. variipennis is found in the north east United States, but is not a vector for Bluetongue virus in this area because of low susceptibility; the C. v. sonorensis is found from Florida to California, north to Virginia and Ohio, and in the west from Washington to British Columbia, but they leave Colorado in the winter; the C. v. occidentalis is found in Arizona to California and from Washington to British Columbia.

=== Morphologic distinctions ===
The C. v. australis and C. v. albertensis have difficulty in defining the subspecies relationship and together make up the C. variipennis complex. There are more outbreaks for Bluetongue virus in California than New York, as the bite rate of C. v. sonorensis is twice as much as the C. v. variipennis. Female C. variipennis show slender to slightly swollen third palpal segments with sensory pits that are shallow round and small as opposed to males Distinction against the subspecies C. v. sonorensis and C. v. occidentalis show that the females are identical morphologically with the enlarged third palpal segment with their sensory pit being a rounded, medium to large size For the male difference of C. v. variipennis, C. v. occidentalis and C. v. sonorensis, on the ventral surface of aedeagus, C. v. variipennis and C. v. occidentalis lack spicules, while male C. v. sonorensis have many prominent spicules on the aedeagus.

== Culicoides variipennis as a vector ==
=== Bluetongue virus ===
Culicoides variipennis attacks in swarms with the Bluetongue virus; this can be devastating to livestock and is the most economically important arthropod borne animal diseases in the United States. C. variipennis transmits the Bluetongue virus, found in North America from latitude 40° N to 35° S. However, the virus is absent from northeast United States because the cold weather does not allow for the vector of the Bluetongue disease. On average, the virus costs $125 million due to the restriction of movement on livestock to countries that are free of the virus. The C. variipennis can transmit diseases if the population density is greater than one per 3.57 km^{2}; however, this can be reduced if the area is treated with insecticide. When the C. variipennis infects sheep, the sheep experience swelling of the tongue and erosions in the mouth and throat, often leading to the death of sheep, abortion, and deformed lambs. When infected with Bluetongue virus, cattle experience similar symptoms such as abortion and stillborn calves, but it is often less severe compared to sheep.

The gut barrier in C. variipennis allows for some prevention of infection of Bluetongue virus via blood meals. Both poor nutrition as a larva and more quantity in blood meal means a higher likelihood of being infected. When naturally infected with Bluetongue virus, the C. variipennis contains the Bluetongue Virus in the thorax, and then is secreted by the fly's saliva while blood feeding for the next 7–10 days, but is only first detected within 4 days. When the C. variipennis is persistently infected, especially in lab, with Bluetongue virus, the anterior and posterior midgut, in addition to the foregut/midgut junction show the most signs of infection. There are also affected cells in the gut cells that then affect the haemocoel and then are detected in a few fat body cells. There is also small detection in low-level range of secondary organs’ fat body cells, but high concentration in the tissues of the organs. While the C. variipennis is orally infected with the Bluetongue virus, the anterior and posterior midgut and the foregut/midgut junction cells show infection. There is no evidence for the Bluetongue virus to be transmitted transovarial from infected females to progeny.

=== Heleidomermis magnapapula (nematode) ===
The nematode Heleidomermis magnapapula is a parasite of C. variipennis. The second stage juvenile H. magnapapula enters in the larval C. variipennis, develops, molts into an adult, and exits the host, killing the host as it exits. This parasitism of H. magnapapula and C. variipennis is commonly found in the Chino Basin in California Riverside County and the Allegheny, Thompson and Cayuga areas of New York.
