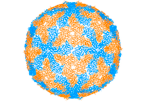
- Cryo-EM of the protein structure of a bluetongue virus capsid
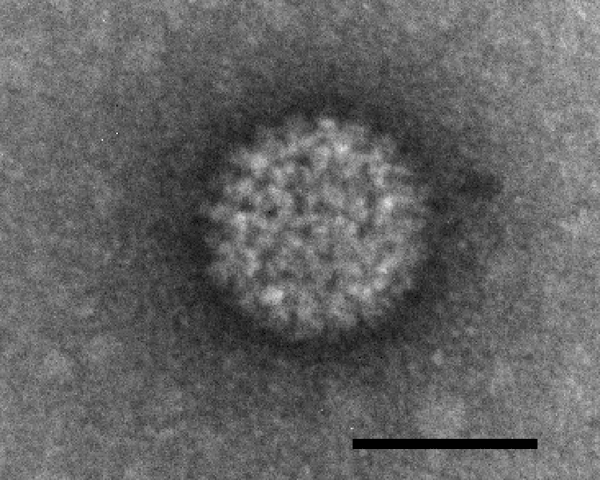
- Negatively stained Bluetongue virus–like particle that caused a cytopathic effect in BHK-21 cells. Scale bar = 50 nm

Virus classification
- (unranked): Virus
- Realm: Riboviria
- Kingdom: Orthornavirae
- Phylum: Duplornaviricota
- Class: Resentoviricetes
- Order: Reovirales
- Family: Sedoreoviridae
- Genus: Orbivirus

= Orbivirus =

Genus of viruses

Orbivirus is a genus of double-stranded RNA viruses in the order Reovirales and the family Sedoreoviridae. Unlike other reoviruses, orbiviruses are arboviruses. They can infect and replicate within a wide range of arthropod and vertebrate hosts. Orbiviruses are named after their characteristic doughnut-shaped capsomers (orbis in Latin means ring).

Many orbiviruses are transmitted by ticks or haematophagus insect vectors (Culicoides, mosquitoes and sand flies) and have a wide host range that includes cattle, goats and sheep, wild ruminants, equids, camelids, marsupials, sloths, bats, birds, large canine and feline carnivores, and humans.

The three economically most important orbiviruses are Bluetongue virus, African horse sickness virus, and epizootic hemorrhagic disease virus, all of which are transmitted by Culicoides species. The genus contains 22 species and at least 130 different serotypes.

== History ==
In 1719, African horse sickness virus (AHSV) caused the first major recorded orbivirus epidemic, killing 1,500 animals. The most historically significant outbreak of orbivirus occurred in 1854–1855, when AHSV infected 70,000 horses. AHSV was discovered to be a virus in 1900 and bluetongue disease followed shortly thereafter in 1905. Outbreaks have occurred sporadically in the 20th and 21st centuries.

== Virology ==
=== Structure ===
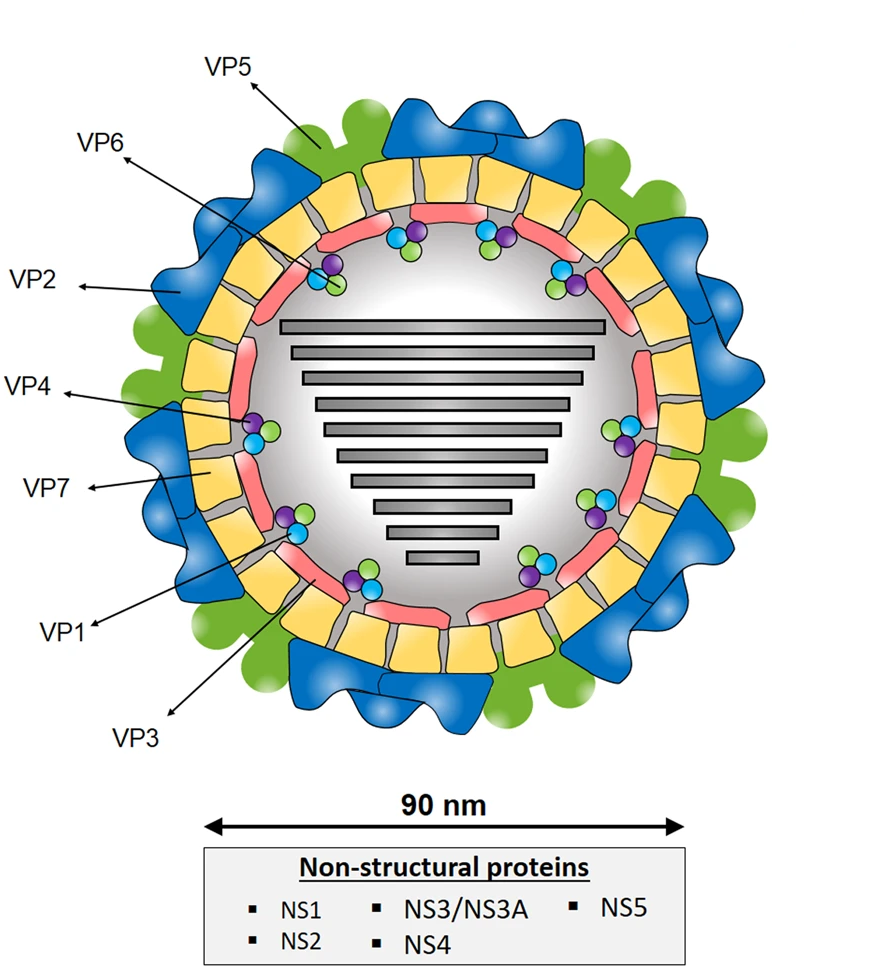
Three concentric layers constituted by VP2 and VP5 (outer capsid), VP7 (intermediate layer), and VP3 (subcore) characterized bluetongue virus virions (~90 nm in diameter)

The virions are nonenveloped particles that are 70–80 nm in diameter. The virus particles are spherical in appearance and have icosahedral symmetry. An outer and an inner capsid layer surround the genome, and have T=13 and T=2 symmetry, respectively. The viron is constructed of two concentric protein shells, the subcore layer which contain 120 copies/particle of the VP3 and the core-surface layer composed of 780 copies/particle of the VP7. VP1, VP4, and VP6 are minor enzymatic proteins that are packaged along with the 10 genome segments within the central space of the virus core. The orbivirus outer-capsid layer is composed of two additional structural proteins (VP2 and VP5) which mediate cell-attachment and penetration during initiation of infection. The outer-capsid proteins are more variable than the core proteins and most of the non-structural proteins and the specificity of their reactions with neutralising antibodies determines the virus serotype.

=== Genome ===
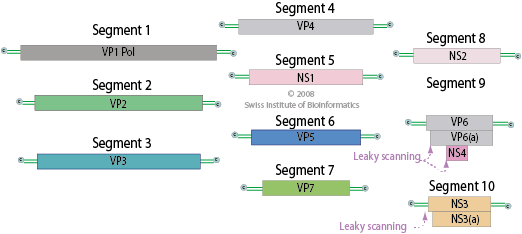
Genome map of Orbivirus

These viruses have double-stranded RNA genomes, so are classified as Class III viruses. Their genome is linear and is segmented into 10 segments of various lengths. One copy of each gene segment is packaged per virion. In most cases, each gene segment encodes a single open reading frame (ORF). The genome encodes seven major structural proteins (VP1–VP7) and three major nonstructural proteins (NS1–NS3). Exceptions to the one gene–one protein rule are segment 9 (Seg-9) and segment 10 (Seg-10), both of which encode two nearly identical proteins initiated from in-phase AUG codons close together near the upstream termini (VP6 and VP6a encoded by Seg-9: NS3 and NS3a encoded by Seg-10).

An ORF spans almost the entire length of genome segment 9 and encodes VP6 (the viral helicase). A second ORF (OrfX) is also present on this segment and encodes a fourth nonstructural protein (NS4), which was predicted from sequence analysis of various orbiviruses including segment 9 of Great Island virus which contained a long NS4 ORF (around 21kDa). The existence of NS4 was experimentally confirmed in both insect-borne and tick-borne orbiviruses in 2011.

NS1 is the most abundant protein in bluetongue virus infected cells. It forms tubules that may be involved in translocation of progeny virus particles to the cell membrane. NS2 is phosphorylated by cellular kinases and is an important matrix protein of the granular viral inclusion bodies that form within the cytoplasm of infected cells. These viral inclusion bodies act as the centres of viral replication. The membrane glycoproteins NS3 and NS3a are expressed in large numbers in insect cells, but not in mammalian cells. They are involved in the release of progeny virus particles from infected cells and may be involved in determination of both vector competence and virulence.

=== Life cycle ===
Many orbiviruses preferentially infect vascular endothelial cells. Orbiviruses enter the host cell by endocytosis and the outer capsid is subsequently removed. The whole cycle of viral replication takes place within the cytoplasm of the host cell. Transcription of the viral genome into mRNA occurs within the core particle and mRNA is translated into proteins using the host cell ribosomes. Viral proteins are synthesized 2–14 days after initial infection. New virons self-assemble within the cytoplasm and are then released from the host cell by budding. During the budding process, they transiently acquire a lipid envelope which can be detected for a short period of time following their release, but this is subsequently lost.

== Pathogenesis ==
Orbiviruses primarily cause diseases in animals. The different Orbivirus species have different host specificities. Orbiviruses are vector-borne pathogens transmitted between vertebrate hosts by vectors such as mosquitoes, midges, gnats, sandflies, and ticks. Bluetongue virus (BTV) is an Orbivirus that causes bluetongue disease in sheep, cattle, goats, and wild ungulates. BTV has been in the forefront of molecular studies for last three decades and now represents one of the best understood viruses at the molecular and structural levels. Other species of orbiviruses are responsible for other diseases of animals such as African horse sickness and equine encephalosis virus.

== Taxonomy ==
=== Species ===
The genus Orbivirus contains the following species, listed by scientific name and followed by the exemplar virus of the species:

- Orbivirus alphaequi, African horse sickness virus
- Orbivirus alphamitchellense, Corriparta virus
- Orbivirus betaequi, Equine encephalosis virus
- Orbivirus betamitchellense, Wallal virus
- Orbivirus caerulinguae, Bluetongue virus
- Orbivirus changuinolaense, Changuinola virus
- Orbivirus chenudaense, Chenuda virus
- Orbivirus chobarense, Chobar Gorge virus
- Orbivirus deltamitchellense, Wongorr virus
- Orbivirus eubenangeense, Eubenangee virus
- Orbivirus gammaequi, Peruvian horse sickness virus
- Orbivirus gammamitchellense, Warrego virus
- Orbivirus lebomboense, Lebombo virus
- Orbivirus magninsulae, Great Island virus
- Orbivirus orungoense, Orungo virus
- Orbivirus palyamense, Palyam virus
- Orbivirus ruminantium, Epizootic hemorrhagic disease virus
- Orbivirus saintcroixense, St Croix River virus
- Orbivirus trinidadense, Ieri virus
- Orbivirus umatillaense, Umatilla virus
- Orbivirus wadmedaniense, Wad Medani virus
- Orbivirus yunnanense, Yunnan orbivirus

=== Serogroups ===
The genus is divided into several (at least 14) serogroups. The serogroups are divided in some cases into subgroups. A number of member viruses have yet to be assigned to a serogroup. The serogroups are differentiated on the basis of a fourfold or greater difference in antibody based tests. These tests include ELISAs and complement fixation tests.

Orbiviruses listed by serogroup

- Lebombo virus
- Pata virus
- African horse sickness virus (Serotypes 1–9)
  - African horse sickness virus
- Bluetongue virus (serotypes 1–26)
- Changuinola serogroup
  - Acatinga virus
  - Altamira virus
  - Almeirim virus
  - Caninde virus
  - Changuinola virus
  - Irituia virus
  - Jamanxi virus
  - Jari virus
  - Gurupi virus
  - Monte Dourado virus
  - Ourem virus
  - Purus virus
  - Saraca virus
- Corriparta serogroup
  - Acado virus
  - Corriparta virus
- Eubenangee serogroup
  - Eubenangee virus
  - Tilligerry virus
- Epizootic haemorrhagic disease serogroup
  - Epizootic hemorrhagic disease virus 1
  - Epizootic hemorrhagic disease virus 2
  - Kawanabe virus
- Equine encephalosis serogroup
  - Equine encephalosis virus
- Great Island virus
  - Kemerovo virus
  - Essaouira virus
  - Kala iris virus
  - Mill Door/79 virus
  - Rabbit syncytium virus
  - Tribeč virus
  - Broadhaven virus
  - Chenuda subgroup
  - Wad Medani subgroup
- Orungo virus(serotypes 1–3)
- Palyam serogroup
  - Abadina virus
  - Apies River virus
  - Bunyip Creek virus
  - Chuzan (Kasba) virus
  - CSIRO Village virus
  - D'Aguilar virus
  - Marrakai virus
  - Petevo virus
  - Vellore virus
- Umatilla serogroup
  - Llano Seco virus
  - Minnal virus
  - Netivot virus
  - Umatilla virus
- Wallal serogroup
  - Wallal virus
- Warrego serogroup
  - Mitchell River virus
  - Warrego virus
- Wongorr serogroup
  - Paroo River virus
  - Picola virus
  - Wongorr virus

=== Vector groups ===
Member viruses are transmitted by midges (Culicoides), mosquitoes, and ticks. The viruses transmitted by a particular type of vector are generally related both genetically and serologically.

Orbiviruses listed by vector group
Different vector groups:

==== Midge vector group ====
- African horse sickness virus
- Bluetongue virus
- Chuzan virus
- Epizootic haemorrhagic disease virus
- Equine encephalosis virus
- Eubenengee virus
- Palyam virus
- Wallal virus
- Warrego virus

==== Mosquito vector group ====
- Corriparta virus
- Peruvian horse sickness virus
- Wongorr virus
- Umatilla virus
- Yunnan virus

==== Tick vector group ====
- Broadhaven virus
- Great Island virus
- Kemerovo virus
- Lipovnik virus
- Tribec viruses

==== Undetermined vector ====
The vector(s) of the St Croix river virus are not known and based on its genome sequence this virus does not appear to group with any other vector group.

==== Notes ====
The tick group may be ancestral to the other groups.

== See also ==
- Above Maiden virus
- Animal viruses
