= Antenne Centre Télévision =

Belgian television channel

The logo of the channel.

Antenne Centre Télévision (English: Television Center Antenna) (ACTV) is a Belgian television channel, broadcast in eleven municipalities in the Centre Region. It is one of the twelve local televisions recognized in the French Community Wallonia-Brussels.

== History ==
The channel was founded in 1982. In 2019, the station survived financial problems.

== Personalities ==
=== Former ===
- Florence Reuter
