= African horse sickness =

African horse sickness virus

Virus classification
- (unranked): Virus
- Realm: Riboviria
- Kingdom: Orthornavirae
- Phylum: Duplornaviricota
- Class: Resentoviricetes
- Order: Reovirales
- Family: Sedoreoviridae
- Genus: Orbivirus
- Species: Orbivirus alphaequi

Species of virus

African horse sickness (AHS) is a highly infectious and often fatal disease caused by African horse sickness virus. It commonly affects horses, mules, and donkeys. It is caused by a virus of the genus Orbivirus belonging to the family Sedoreoviridae. This disease can be caused by any of the nine serotypes of this virus. AHS is not directly contagious, but is known to be spread by insect vectors.

== Epidemiology ==
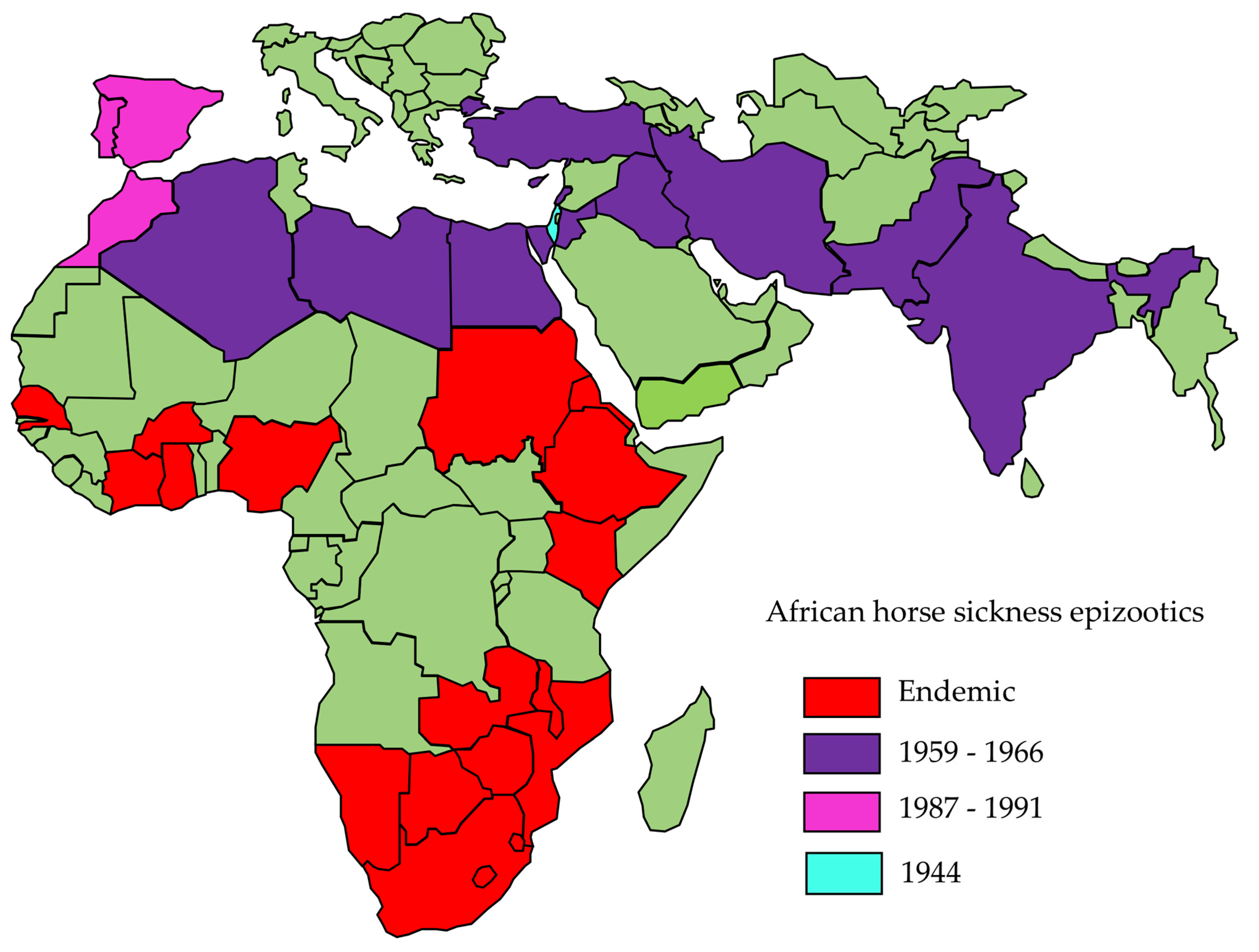
A map of African horse sickness outbreaks that have occurred worldwide during the last century

AHS virus was first recorded south of the Sahara Desert in the mid-1600s, with the introduction of horses to southern Africa. The virus is considered endemic to the equatorial, eastern, and southern regions of Africa. Several outbreaks have occurred in the Equidae throughout Africa and elsewhere. AHS is known to be endemic in sub-Saharan Africa, and has spread to Morocco, the Middle East, India, and Pakistan. More recently, outbreaks have been reported in the Iberian Peninsula and Thailand. AHS has never been reported in the Americas, eastern Asia, or Australasia. Epidemiology is dependent on host-vector interaction, where cyclic disease outbreaks coincide with high numbers of competent vectors. The most important vector for AHS in endemic areas is the biting midge Culicoides imicola, which prefers warm, humid conditions. Larvae do not carry the virus, and long, cold winters are sufficient to break epidemics in nonendemic areas.

== Host ==
The common hosts of this disease are horses, mules, donkeys, and zebras. However, elephants, camels, and dogs can be infected, as well, but often show no signs of the disease and it is very rare. Dogs usually contract the disease by eating infected horse meat, although a recent report has been made of the disease occurring in dogs with no known horse-meat ingestion.

== Transmission ==
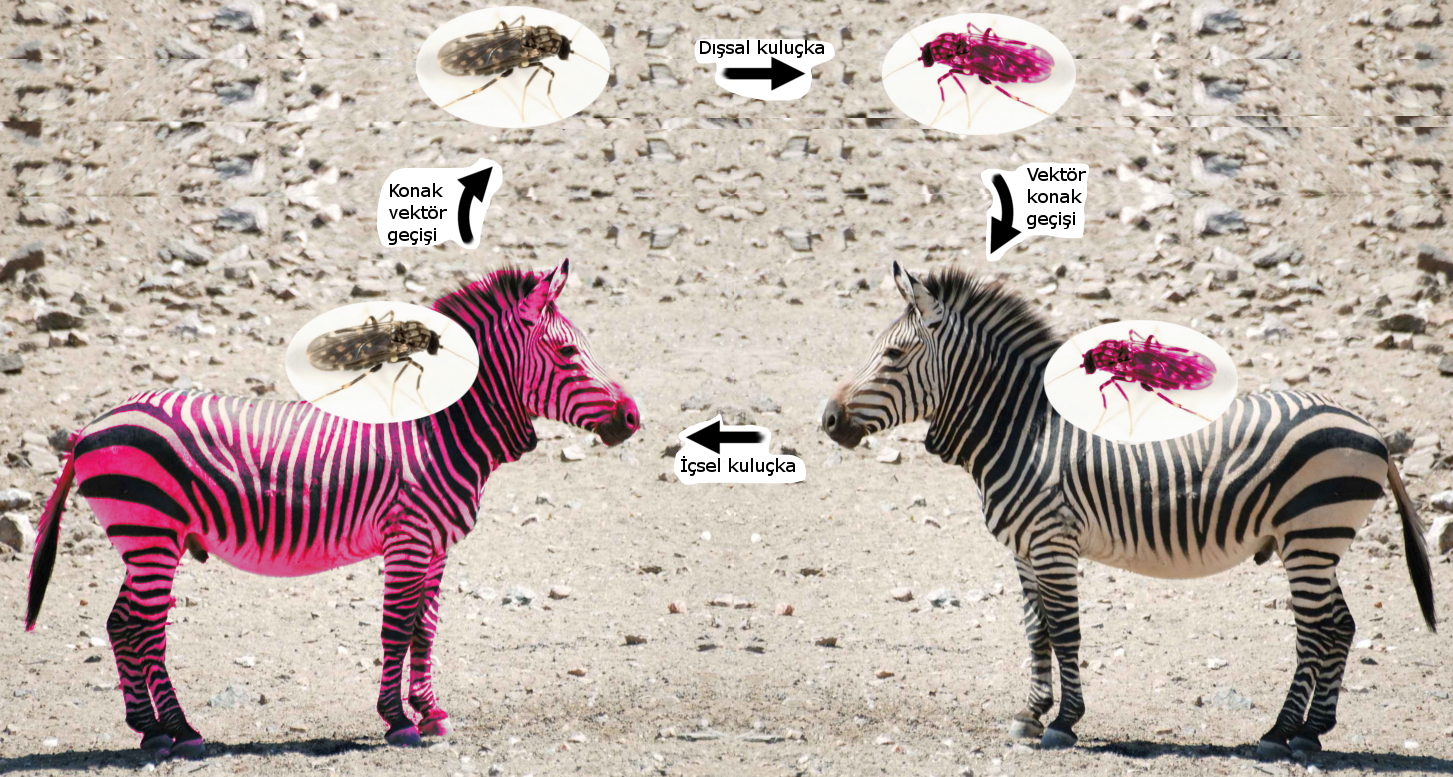
Transmission of African horse sickness virus by insect vector

This disease is spread by insect vectors. The biological vector of the virus is the Culicoides (midges) species, but this disease can also be transmitted by species of mosquitoes including Culex, Anopheles, and Aedes including A. aegypti, and species of ticks such as Hyalomma and Rhipicephalus.

== Clinical signs ==
Horses are the most susceptible host with close to 90% mortality of those affected, followed by mules (50%) and donkeys (10%). African donkeys and zebras very rarely display clinical symptoms, despite high virus titres in blood, and are thought to be the natural reservoir of the virus. AHS manifests itself in four different forms:

Pulmonary form

The peracute form of the disease is characterized by high fever, depression, and respiratory symptoms. The clinically affected animal has trouble breathing, starts coughing frothy fluid from nostril and mouth, and shows signs of pulmonary edema within four days. Serious lung congestion causes respiratory failure and results in death in under 24 hours. This form of the disease has the second highest mortality rate. Other symptoms include swelling of the lymph nodes under the jaw, and levelled swelling above the eyes. This form does not have as much swelling on the brain as the Cardiac form, the swelling is mostly around the organs.

Cardiac form

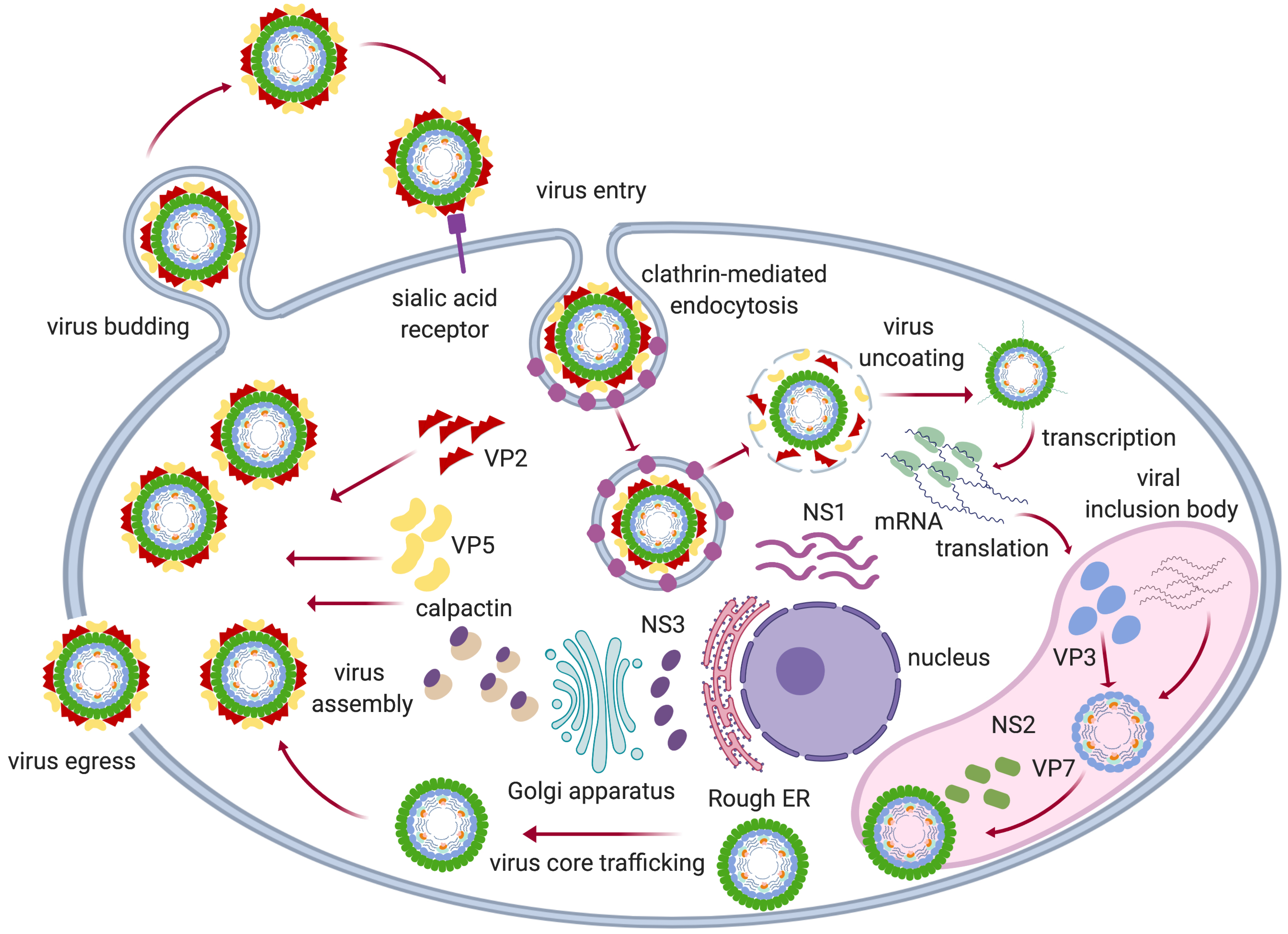
Replication cycle of African horse sickness virus (AHSV)

This subacute form of the disease has an incubation period longer than that of the pulmonary form. Signs of disease start at day 7–12 after infection. High fever is a common symptom. The disease also manifests as conjunctivitis, with abdominal pain and progressive dyspnea. Additionally, edema is presented under the skin of the head and neck, most notably in swelling of the supraorbital fossae, palpebral conjunctiva, and intermandibular space. Mortality rate is between 50 and 70%, and survivors recover in 7 days. This form does not have such a high mortality rate, but the lymph nodes and above the eyes are not as swelled. The swelling above the eyes are a sign that the brain is swollen, and if it is too much the eyes will pop out. If treated correctly the animals has a higher chance of surviving.

Mild or horse sickness fever form

Mild to subclinical disease is seen in zebras and African donkeys. Infected animals may have a low-grade fever and congested mucous membrane. The survival rate is 100%.

Mixed form

Diagnosis is made at necropsy. Affected horses show signs of both the pulmonary and cardiac forms of AHS. This form probably has the highest mortality rate of all the forms. Not many survive this.

== Diagnosis ==
Presumptive diagnosis is made by characteristic clinical signs, post mortem lesions, and presence of competent vectors. Laboratory confirmation is by viral isolation, with such techniques as quantitative PCR for detecting viral RNA, antigen capture (ELISA), and immunofluorescence of infected tissues. Serological tests are only useful for detecting recovered animals, as sick animals die before they are able to mount effective immune responses.

== Treatment and prevention ==
No treatment for AHS is known.

Control of an outbreak in an endemic region involves quarantine, vector control, and vaccination. To prevent this disease, the affected horses are usually slaughtered, and the uninfected horses are vaccinated against the virus. Three vaccines currently exist, which include a polyvalent vaccine, a monovalent vaccine, and a monovalent inactivated vaccine. This disease can also be prevented by destroying the insect vector habitats and by using insecticides.

== History ==
African horse sickness was diagnosed in Spain in 1987–90 and in Portugal in 1989, but was eradicated using slaughter policies, movement restrictions, vector eradication, and vaccination.

Infection was reported in the Pak Chong district of Nakhon Ratchasima province in Thailand in March 2020 when 42 racehorses died from an unknown illness which was later confirmed to be African Horse Sickness virus serotype 1.

== Related diseases ==
AHS is related to bluetongue disease and is spread by the same midge (Culicoides species).
