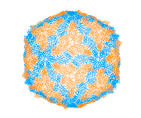
- Cryo-EM of protein capsid structure of rice dwarf virus (RDV)

Virus classification
- (unranked): Virus
- Realm: Riboviria
- Kingdom: Orthornavirae
- Phylum: Duplornaviricota
- Class: Resentoviricetes
- Order: Reovirales
- Family: Sedoreoviridae

= Sedoreoviridae =

Family of viruses

Sedoreoviridae (sedo = smooth) is a family of the Reovirales order of viruses. Viruses in this family are distinguished by the absence of a turreted protein on the inner capsid to produce a smooth surface.

== Taxonomy ==
The family contains the following genera:

- Cardoreovirus
- Crabreovirus
- Mimoreovirus
- Orbivirus
- Phytoreovirus
- Rotavirus
- Seadornavirus

== Characteristics ==
Like other members of the Reovirales order, viruses of the Sedoreoviridae family are made of naked, icosahedral capsids containing 10-12 segments of linear double-stranded RNA (dsRNA). The Baltimore System of viral classification categorizes Reovirales in Group III.

== Importance ==
Viruses classified in the Sedoreoviridae family infect a wide range of plants and animals, including some that can infect humans. There is not only the potential of a few of these viruses to cause human disease, but also to reduce the supply of crops and livestock.

== Viruses ==
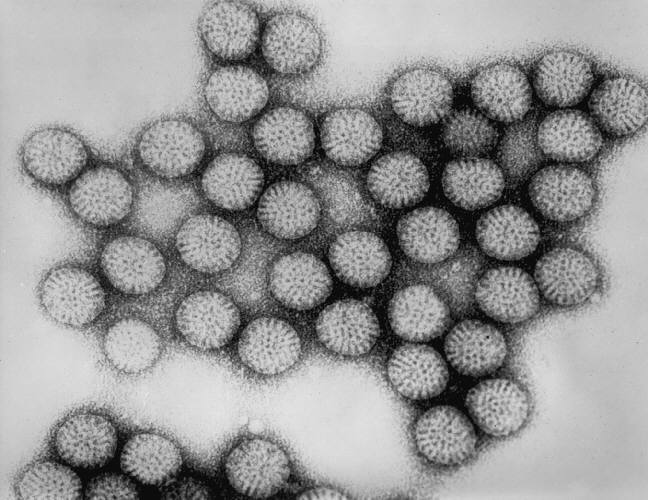
Intact double-shelled Rotavirus particles

=== Genus Cardoreovirus ===
Eriocheir sinensis reovirus was isolated out of a Chinese mitten crab (Eriocheir sinensis). No currently known associated disease.

=== Genus Mimoreovirus ===
Microsomonas pusilla reovirus was isolated from the marine protist Micromonas pusilla.

=== Genus Orbivirus ===
Some Orbivirus infect livestock with high rates of morbidity and mortality. Includes: Bluetongue virus, African horse sickness virus, Epizootic hemorrhagic disease virus, among others.

=== Genus Phytoreovirus ===
Known phytoreoviruses are plant pathogens causing dwarfism and the formation of tumors. Included: Rice dwarf virus, Rice gall dwarf virus, and Wound tumor virus.

=== Genus Rotavirus ===
Rotavirus A-E cause infantile gastroenteritis in humans and farm animals.

=== Genus Seadornavirus ===
Many known Seadornaviruses cause encephalitis in humans. Included: Banna virus, Kadipiro virus, and Liao ning virus.
