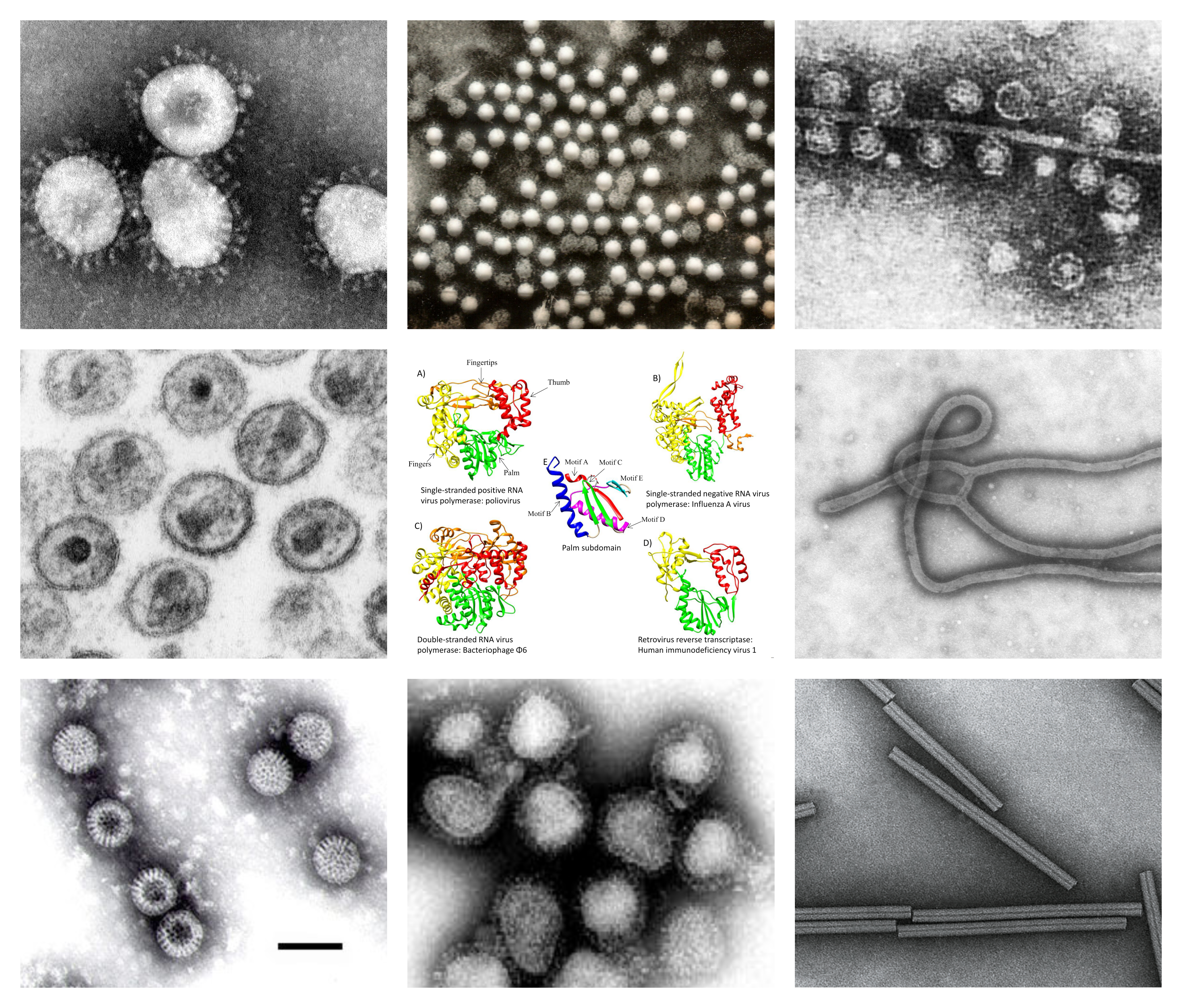
- Clockwise from top left: TEM of avian coronavirus, polio virus, bacteriophage Qβ, Ebolavirus, tobacco mosaic virus, Influenza A virus, Rotavirus, HIV-1. Center: homologous RT and RdRps with conserved palm domain.

Virus classification
- (unranked): Virus
- Realm: Riboviria

Kingdoms
- Orthornavirae; Pararnavirae

= Riboviria =

Realm of viruses

Riboviria is a realm of viruses that includes all viruses that use a homologous RNA-dependent polymerase for replication. It includes RNA viruses that encode an RNA-dependent RNA polymerase, as well as reverse-transcribing viruses (with either RNA or DNA genomes) that encode an RNA-dependent DNA polymerase. RNA-dependent RNA polymerase (RdRp), also called RNA replicase, produces RNA (ribonucleic acid) from RNA. RNA-dependent DNA polymerase (RdDp), also called reverse transcriptase (RT), produces DNA (deoxyribonucleic acid) from RNA. These enzymes are essential for replicating the viral genome and transcribing viral genes into messenger RNA (mRNA) for translation of viral proteins.

Riboviria was established in 2018 to accommodate all RdRp-encoding RNA viruses and was expanded a year later to also include RdDp-encoding viruses. These two groups of viruses are assigned to two separate kingdoms: Orthornavirae for RdRp-encoding RNA viruses, and Pararnavirae for RdDp-encoding viruses, i.e. all reverse-transcribing viruses. Most identified eukaryotic viruses belong to the realm, including most human, animal, and plant viruses. Historically, few prokaryotic RNA viruses had been discovered to be included in the realm, but in the 2020s metagenomic and metatranscriptomic studies have discovered many prokaryotic RNA viruses.

Many of the most widely known viral diseases are caused by viruses in Riboviria, which includes coronaviruses, ebola virus, HIV, influenza viruses, and the rabies virus. These viruses and others in the realm have been prominent throughout history, including tobacco mosaic virus, which was the first virus to be discovered. Many reverse-transcribing viruses integrate their genome into the genome of their host as part of their replication cycle. As a result of that, it is estimated that about 7–8% of the human genome originates from these viruses.

== Etymology ==
Riboviria is a portmanteau of ribo, which refers to ribonucleic acid, and the suffix -viria, which is the suffix used for virus realms. Members of the realm are called ribovirians.

== Characteristics ==
All members of Riboviria contain a gene that encodes for an RNA-dependent polymerase, also called RNA-directed polymerase. There are two types of RNA-dependent polymerases: RNA-dependent RNA polymerase (RdRp), also called RNA replicase, which synthesizes RNA from RNA, and RNA-dependent DNA polymerase (RdDp), also called reverse transcriptase (RT), which synthesizes DNA from RNA. For viruses in Riboviria, in a typical virus particle, called a virion, the RNA-dependent polymerase is bound to the viral genome in some manner and begins transcription of the viral genome after entering a cell. As part of a virus's life cycle, the RNA-dependent polymerase also synthesizes copies of the viral genome as part of the process of creating new viruses.

Riboviria contains three types of viruses that replicate via RdRp: single-stranded RNA (ssRNA) viruses, which are either positive (+) or negative (-) sense, and double-stranded RNA viruses (dsRNA), all of which belong to the kingdom Orthornavirae. +ssRNA viruses have genomes that can functionally act as mRNA, and a negative-sense strand can also be created to form dsRNA from which mRNA is transcribed from the negative strand. The negative-sense strands of the genomes of -ssRNA viruses and dsRNA viruses act as templates from which RdRp creates mRNA.

There are two types of viruses in Riboviria that replicate via reverse transcription: single-stranded RNA (ssRNA-RT) viruses, all of which belong to the order Ortervirales, and double-stranded DNA (dsDNA-RT) viruses, which belong to the family Caulimoviridae, also in Ortervirales, and the family Hepadnaviridae of the order Blubervirales. Reverse-transcribing viruses all belong to the kingdom Pararnavirae. ssRNA-RT viruses have their positive-sense genome transcribed by RdDp to synthesize a negative-sense complementary DNA (-cDNA) strand. The +RNA strand is degraded and later replaced by RdDp with a +DNA strand to synthesize a linear dsDNA copy of the viral genome. This genome is then integrated into the host cell's DNA.

For dsDNA-RT viruses, a pregenomic +RNA strand is transcribed from the relaxed circular DNA (rcDNA), which is in turn used by RdDp to transcribe a -cDNA strand. The +RNA strand is degraded and replaced in a similar manner as +ssRNA-RT viruses to synthesize rcDNA. The rcDNA genome is later repaired by the host cell's DNA repair mechanisms to synthesize a covalently closed circular DNA (cccDNA) genome. The integrated genome of +ssRNA-RT viruses and the cccDNA of dsDNA-RT viruses are then transcribed into mRNA by the host cell enzyme RNA polymerase II.

Viral mRNA is translated by the host cell's ribosomes to produce viral proteins. In order to produce more viruses, viral RNA-dependent polymerases use copies of the viral genome as templates to replicate the viral genome. For +ssRNA viruses, an intermediate dsRNA genome is created from which +ssRNA is synthesized from the negative strand. For -ssRNA viruses, genomes are synthesized from complementary positive-sense strands. dsRNA viruses replicate their genomes from mRNA by synthesizing a complementary negative-sense strand to form genomic dsRNA. For dsDNA-RT viruses, pregenomic RNA created from the cccDNA is retrotranscribed into new dsDNA genomes. For +ssRNA-RT viruses, the genome is replicated from the integrated genome. After replication and translation, the genome and viral proteins are assembled into complete virions, which then leave the host cell.

Viruses of Ambiviricota have ambisense, circular ssRNA genomes. Their genomes contain at least two open reading frames (ORFs) and ribozymes in opposite sense orientations of the genome—one positive-sense portion of the genome and one negative-sense portion of the genome. For that reason, they are not considered positive-sense or negative-sense but ambisense. Ambiviricots encode RdRp, but unlike other viruses of Orthornavirae, they replicate their genome via rolling circle replication, a form of replication used for circular genomes. Apart from ambiviricots, some other ssRNA viruses are ambisense because they contain ORFs on both sense strands, including influenza viruses and coronaviruses, but these viruses replicate in the manners typical of -ssRNA and +ssRNA viruses, respectively, so they are still considered -ssRNA and +ssRNA viruses.

== Phylogenetics ==
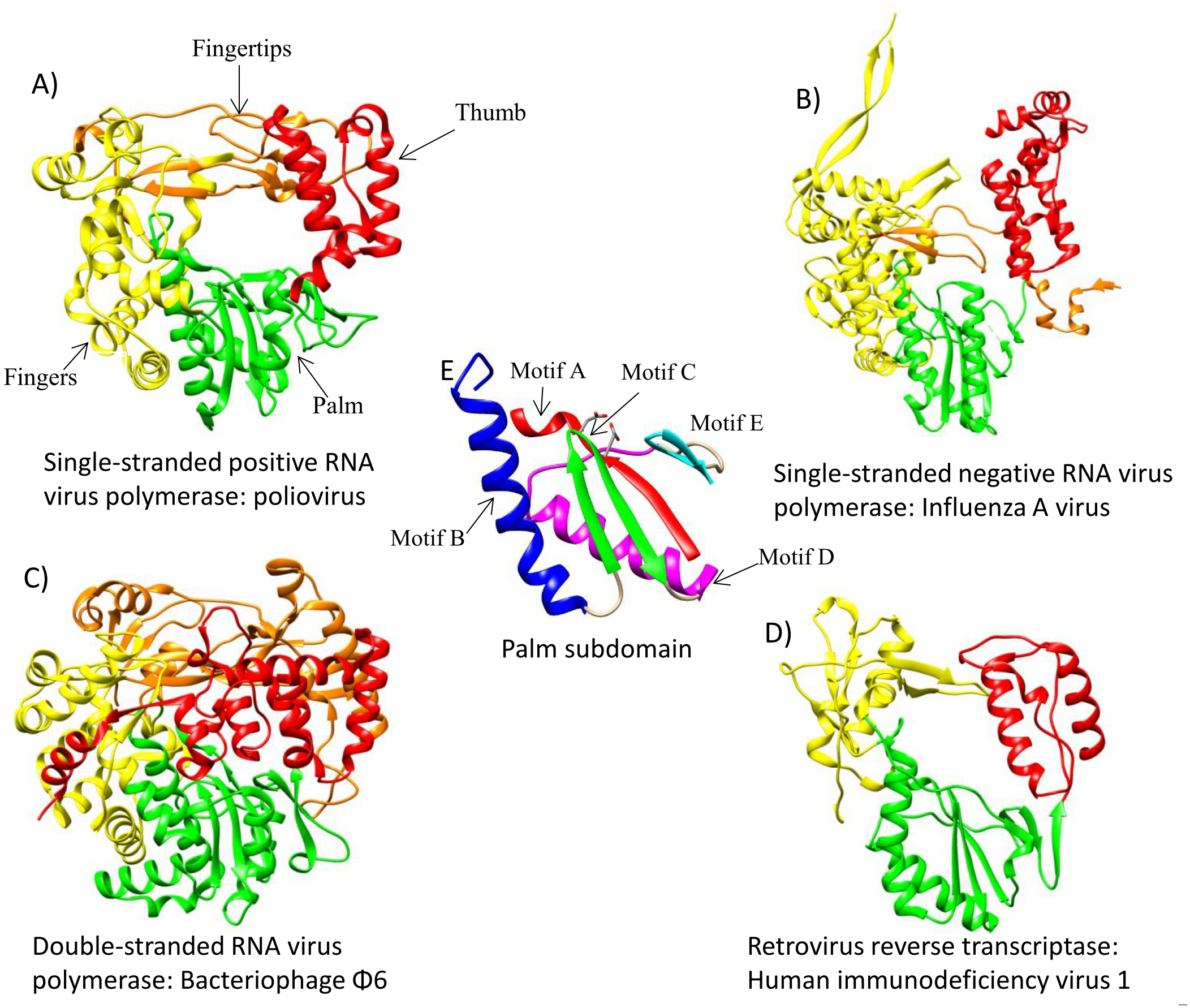
Ribbon diagrams of the RNA polymerases of four distantly-related ribovirians. The highly-conserved palm subdomain is shown in the center and colored green for the four RNA polymerases.

Phylogenetic analysis of RNA polymerases is used to study the evolutionary history of Riboviria because it is the only gene preserved among all ribovirians. The reverse transcriptases of kingdom Pararnavirae show a relation to the RTs of group II introns that encode RTs and non-long terminal repeat (LTR) retrotransposons, which are self-replicating DNA sequences. More specifically, the two orders of the kingdom, Blubervirales and Ortervirales, appear to have evolved from two different retrotransposon families on two separate occasions by acquiring host proteins and using them for virion formation. The origin of Orthornavirae is less clear and different hypotheses exist. In the first hypothesis, viruses of Orthornavirae also originate from retroelements such as group II introns and non-LTR retrotransposons. In the second hypothesis, both retroelements and the viral RdRp are descended from a capsidless RNA replicon that was present in the RNA world.

The unclassified phylum Taraviricota may be such capsidless RNA ancestors as it appears to be the basal lineage from which all Orthornavirae phyla are descended from. The phylum Artimaviricota, so-called "hot spring riboviruses", encode an RdRp that is very distantly related to the RdRp of Orthornavirae and which, based on analysis of its structure, may be an intermediate between RdRps and RTs.

Ribovirians generally have no relation to viral agents outside the realm, with a few exceptions. Viruses of the realm Floreoviria appear to have come into existence when a bacterial plasmid recombined with complementary DNA of a positive-sense RNA virus, which enabled these plasmids to obtain capsid proteins needed to form virions. Likewise, viruses of the realm Volvereviria may originate as plasmids acquiring capsid proteins from an RNA virus. The ribovirian phylum Ambiviricota also appears to have a chimeric origin in which a ribovirian and a ribozyvirian or a ribozyme-containing viroid recombined to form a new lineage.

== Classification ==
Riboviria contains two kingdoms, 8 phyla, 38 orders, 158 families, 1464 genera, and 7485 virus species in the 2025 taxonomy release. The ICTV established taxonomy is shown down to the rank of order.

- Kingdom: Orthornavirae, which contains all RdRp-encoding RNA viruses, i.e. all dsRNA, +ssRNA, -ssRNA, and ambisense ssRNA viruses, often collectively called RNA viruses. 7 phyla:
  - Phylum: Ambiviricota
    - Class: Suforviricetes
      - Order: Crytulvirales
  - Phylum: Artimaviricota
    - Class: Furtirnaviricetes
      - Order: Divaquavirales
  - Phylum: Duplornaviricota
    - Class: Chrymotiviricetes
      - Order: Ghabrivirales
    - Class: Resentoviricetes
      - Order: Reovirales
    - Class: Vidaverviricetes
      - Order: Mindivirales
  - Phylum: Kitrinoviricota
    - Class: Alsuviricetes
      - Order: Hepelivirales
      - Order: Martellivirales
      - Order: Tymovirales
    - Class: Flasuviricetes
      - Order: Amarillovirales
    - Class: Magsaviricetes
      - Order: Nodamuvirales
    - Class: Tolucaviricetes
      - Order: Tolivirales
  - Phylum: Lenarviricota
    - Class: Amabiliviricetes
      - Order: Wolframvirales
    - Class: Howeltoviricetes
      - Order: Cyrppavirales
    - Class: Leviviricetes
      - Order: Norzivirales
      - Order: Timlovirales
    - Class: Miaviricetes
      - Order: Ourlivirales
  - Phylum: Negarnaviricota
    - Subphylum: Haploviricotina
      - Class: Chunqiuviricetes
        - Order: Muvirales
      - Class: Milneviricetes
        - Order: Naedrevirales
      - Class: Monjiviricetes
        - Order: Jingchuvirales
        - Order: Mononegavirales
      - Class: Yunchangviricetes
        - Order: Goujianvirales
    - Subphlyum: Polyploviricotina
      - Class: Bunyaviricetes
        - Order: Elliovirales
        - Order: Hareavirales
      - Class: Insthoviricetes
        - Order: Articulavirales
  - Phylum: Pisuviricota
    - Class: Duplopiviricetes
      - Order: Durnavirales
    - Class: Mycopleornaviricetes
      - Order: Xenadelphovirales
    - Class: Pisoniviricetes
      - Order: Nidovirales
      - Order: Picornavirales
      - Order: Sobelivirales
    - Class: Stelpaviricetes
      - Order: Hypofuvirales
      - Order: Patatavirales
      - Order: Stellavirales
    - Order: Yadokarivirales
  - incertae sedis taxa:
    - Class: Orpoviricetes
      - Order: Bormycovirales
      - Order: Formycovirales
    - Family: Birnaviridae
    - Family: Permutotetraviridae
- Kingdom: Pararnavirae, which contains all RdDp-encoding viruses, i.e. all ssRNA-RT and dsDNA-RT viruses, collectively called reverse-transcribing viruses. Monotypic down to class.
  - Phylum: Artverviricota
    - Class: Revtraviricetes
      - Order: Blubervirales
      - Order: Ortervirales
- incertae sedis taxa:
  - Order: Tombendovirales
  - Family: Tonesaviridae

Riboviria partially merges Baltimore classification with virus taxonomy as it includes the Baltimore groups for RNA viruses and reverse-transcribing viruses in the realm. Baltimore classification is a system used to classify viruses based on their manner of mRNA production. It is often used alongside standard virus taxonomy, which is based on evolutionary history. All members of four Baltimore groups belong to Riboviria: Group III: dsRNA viruses, Group IV: +ssRNA viruses, Group VI: ssRNA-RT viruses, and Group VII: dsDNA-RT viruses. Furthermore, most -ssRNA viruses (Group V) are included in the realm. Realms are the highest level of taxonomy used for viruses and Riboviria is one of ten. The others are Adnaviria, Duplodnaviria, Efunaviria, Floreoviria, Pleomoviria, Ribozyviria, Singelaviria, Varidnaviria, and Volvereviria.

== Interactions with hosts ==
=== Disease ===
Ribovirians are associated with a wide range of diseases, including many of the most widely known viral diseases. Widely-known ribovirians include:

- Coronaviruses
- Crimean-Congo hemorrhagic fever virus
- Dengue virus
- Ebola virus
- Hantaviruses
- Hepatitis viruses A, B, C, and E
- Human immunodeficiency viruses
- Influenza viruses
- Japanese encephalitis virus
- Lassa virus
- Measles virus
- Mumps virus
- Norovirus
- Poliovirus
- Rabies virus
- Respiratory syncytial virus
- Rhinoviruses
- Rift Valley fever virus
- Rotavirus
- Rubella virus
- Tick-borne encephalitis virus
- West Nile virus
- Yellow fever virus
- Zika virus

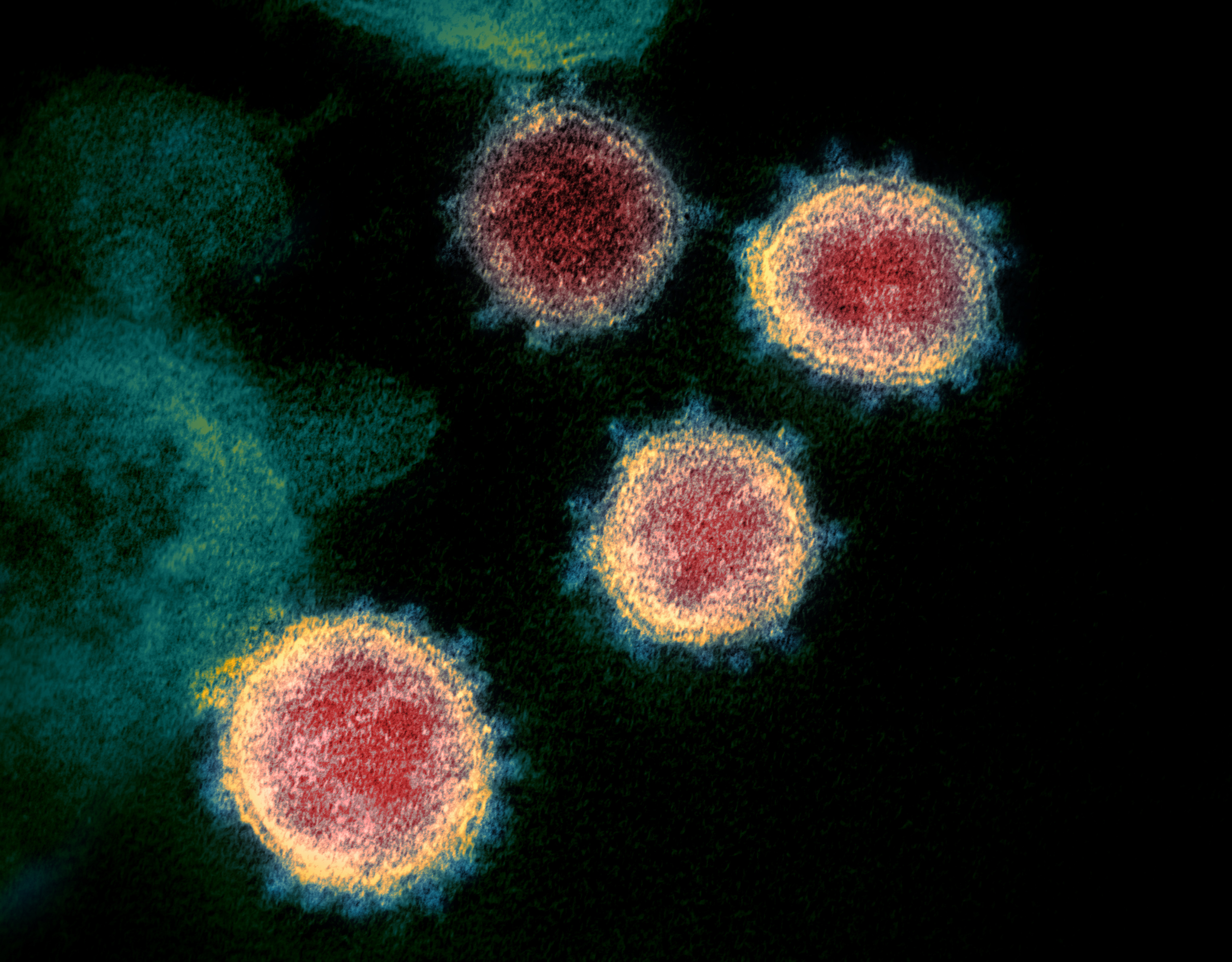
Colourized transmission electron micrograph of SARS-CoV-2, the cause of the COVID-19 pandemic and a ribovirian.

Animal viruses in Riboviria include orbiviruses, which cause various diseases in ruminants and horses, including Bluetongue virus, African horse sickness virus, Equine encephalosis virus, and epizootic hemorrhagic disease virus. The vesicular stomatitis virus causes disease in cattle, horses, and pigs. Bats harbor many viruses including ebolaviruses and henipaviruses, which also can cause disease in humans. Similarly, arthropod viruses in the Orthoflavivirus and Phlebovirus genera are numerous and often transmitted to humans. Coronaviruses and influenza viruses cause disease in various vertebrates, including bats, birds, and pigs. The family Retroviridae contains many viruses that cause leukemia, immunodeficiency, and other cancers and immune system-related diseases in animals.

Plant viruses in the realm are numerous and infect many economically important crops. Tomato spotted wilt virus is estimated to cause more than US$1 billion in damages annually, and it infects more than 800 plant species, including chrysanthemum, lettuce, peanut, pepper, and tomato. Cucumber mosaic virus infects more than 1,200 plant species and likewise causes significant crop losses. Potato virus Y causes significant reductions in yield and quality for pepper, potato, tobacco, and tomato, and Plum pox virus is the most important virus among stone fruit crops. Brome mosaic virus is found throughout much of the world and primarily infects grasses, including cereals, though it does not cause significant economic losses.

=== Endogenization ===
Many reverse-transcribing viruses in Riboviria integrate their genome into the DNA of their host by means of the retroviral enzyme integrase. This endogenization is part of their replication cycle, as mRNA is produced from the integrated DNA. Endogenization is a form of horizontal gene transfer between unrelated organisms, and it is estimated that about 7–8% of the human genome consists of retroviral DNA. Endogenization can be used to study the evolutionary history of viruses as it shows an approximate time period when a virus first became endogenized into the host's genome as well as the rate of evolution for the viruses since endogenization first occurred.

== History ==
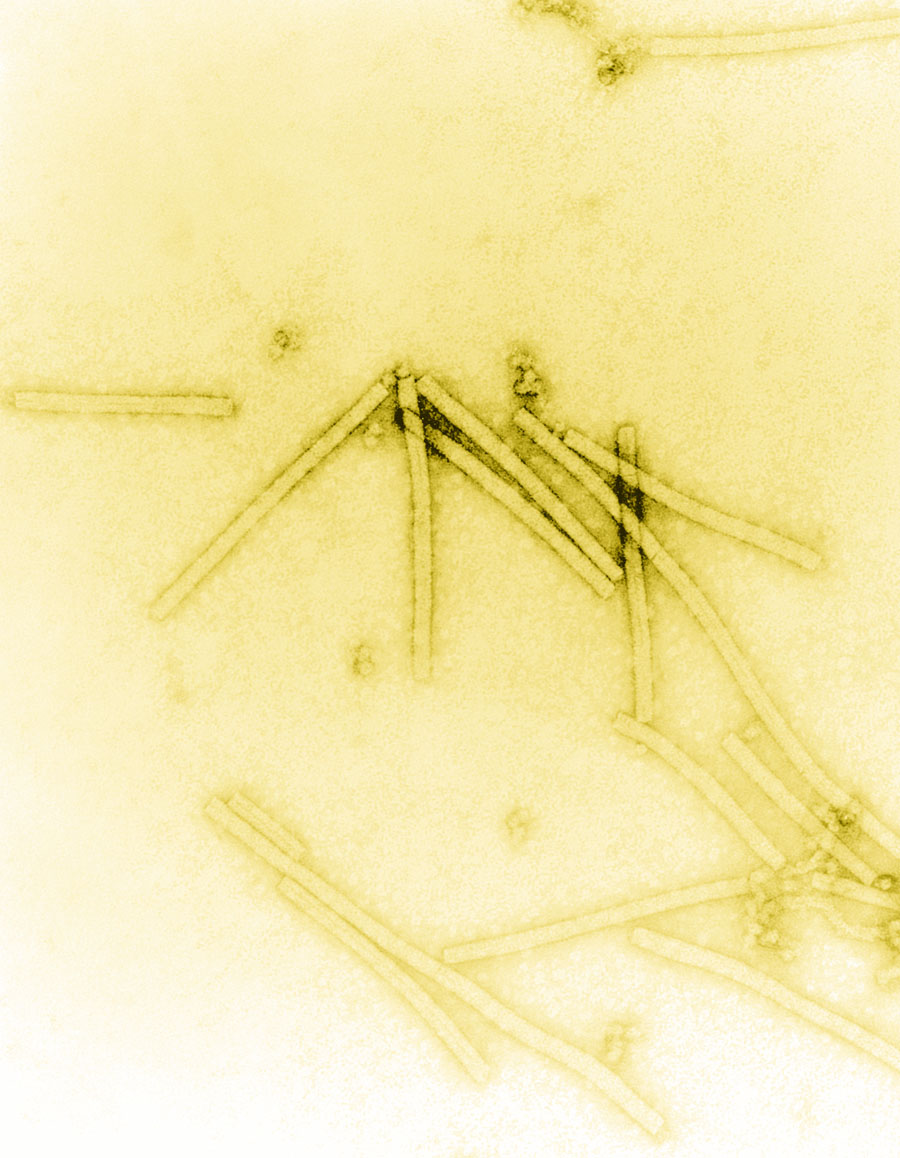
Transmission electron micrograph of Tobacco mosaic virus, the first virus to be discovered and a ribovirian.

Diseases caused by viruses in Riboviria have been known for much of recorded history, though their cause was only discovered in modern times. Tobacco mosaic virus was discovered in 1898 and was the first virus to be discovered. Viruses transmitted by arthropods have been central in the development of vector control, which often aims to prevent viral infections. In modern history, numerous disease outbreaks have been caused by various members of the realm, including coronaviruses, ebola, and influenza. HIV especially has had dramatic effects on society as it causes a sharp decline in life expectancy and significant stigma for infected persons.

For a long time, the relation between many viruses in Riboviria could not be established due to the high amount of genetic divergence among RNA viruses. With the development of viral metagenomics, many additional RNA viruses were identified, helping to fill in the gaps of their relations. This led to the establishment of Riboviria in 2018 to accommodate all RdRp-encoding RNA viruses based on phylogenetic analysis that they were related. A year later, all reverse-transcribing viruses were added to the realm. The kingdoms were also established in 2019, separating the two RNA-dependent polymerase branches. When the realm was founded, it mistakenly included two viroid families, Avsunviroidae and Pospiviroidae, and the genus Deltavirus, which were removed in 2019 because they use host cell enzymes for replication and not RdRp or RdDp.

Traditionally, Riboviria mainly included eukaryotic viruses with few prokaryotic viruses. Metagenomic and metatranscriptomic research in the 2020s however have discovered many viruses, including many bacterial RNA viruses. These discoveries have mainly occurred in marine environments, where many novel lineages of microbial eukaryotic and prokaryotic RNA viruses have been discovered. Leviviruses, a group of bacterial RNA viruses that previously constituted the family Leviviridae, were promoted to the rank of class, Leviviricetes, due to the large number of leviviruses discovered. Numerous novel phyla of Orthornavirae were discovered in the 2020s, including the possibly basal lineage Taraviricota. The ecological role of these novel marine viruses is relatively unexplored, but they may be involved in the recycling of nutrients in a process called viral shunt.

== See also ==
- List of higher virus taxa
