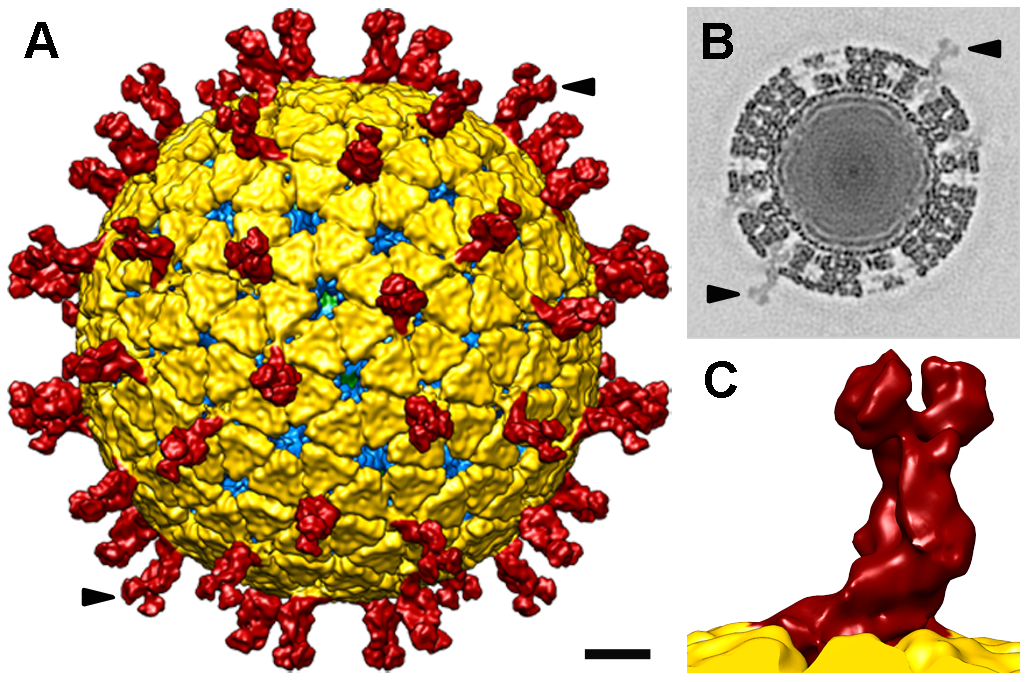
- Cryo-EM reconstruction of a rotavirus

Virus classification
- (unranked): Virus
- Realm: Riboviria
- Kingdom: Orthornavirae
- Phylum: Duplornaviricota
- Class: Resentoviricetes
- Order: Reovirales

Families
- Sedoreoviridae; Spinareoviridae

= Reovirales =

Order of viruses

Reovirales is an order of double-stranded RNA viruses. It is the only member of the class Resentoviricetes. Member viruses, called reoviruses, have a wide host range, including vertebrates, invertebrates, plants, protists and fungi. They lack lipid envelopes and package their segmented genome within multi-layered capsids. Lack of a lipid envelope has allowed three-dimensional structures of these large complex viruses (diameter ~60–100 nm) to be obtained, revealing a structural and likely evolutionary relationship to the cystovirus family of bacteriophage. Reoviruses can affect the gastrointestinal system (such as rotaviruses) and respiratory tract. The name "reo-" is an acronym for "respiratory enteric orphan" viruses. The term "orphan virus" refers to the fact that some of these viruses have been observed not associated with any known disease. Even though viruses in the order Reovirales have more recently been identified with various diseases, the original name is still used.

Reovirus infections occur often in humans, but most cases are mild or subclinical. Rotaviruses, however, can cause severe diarrhea and intestinal distress in children, and lab studies in mice have implicated orthoreoviruses in the expression of coeliac disease in pre-disposed individuals. The virus can be readily detected in feces, and may also be recovered from pharyngeal or nasal secretions, urine, cerebrospinal fluid, and blood. Despite the ease of finding reoviruses in clinical specimens, their role in human disease or treatment is still uncertain.

Some viruses of this order, such as phytoreoviruses and oryzaviruses, infect plants. Most of the plant-infecting reoviruses are transmitted between plants by insect vectors. The viruses replicate in both the plant and the insect, generally causing disease in the plant, but little or no harm to the infected insect.

== Structure ==
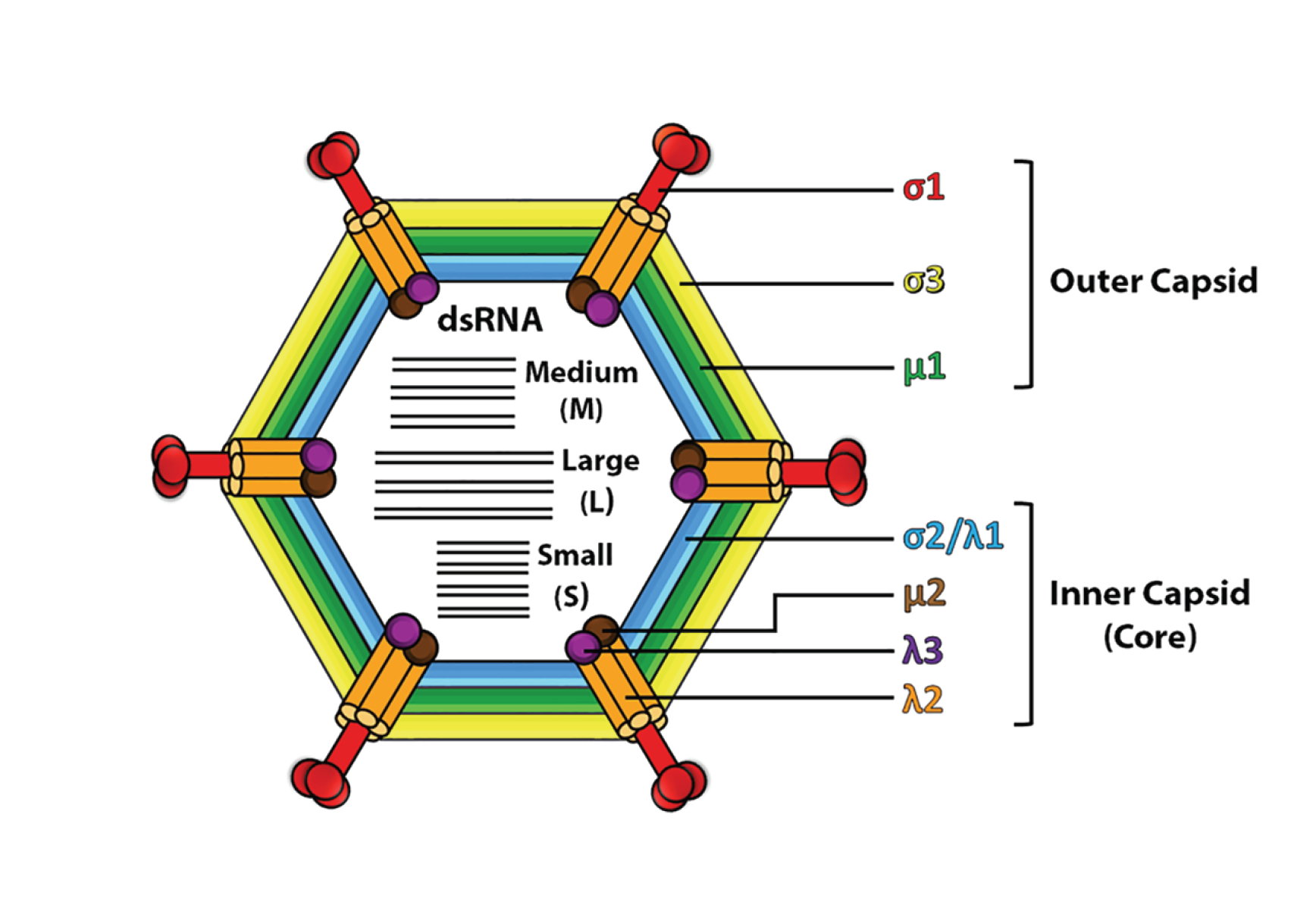
Structure of a reovirus

Reoviruses are non-enveloped and have an icosahedral capsid composed of an outer (T=13) and inner (T=2) protein shell. Ultrastructure studies show that virion capsids are composed of two or three separate layers depending on species. The innermost layer (core) has T=1 icosahedral symmetry and is composed of 60 units. The core contains the genome segments, which encode enzymes required for transcription. The core is covered by an outer capsid with T=13 icosahedral symmetry. Reoviruses have a unique structure that contains a glycosylated spike protein on the surface.

== Genome ==
The genomes of viruses in the order Reovirales contain 9–12 segments which are grouped into three categories corresponding to their size: L (large), M (medium) and S (small). Segments range from about 0.2 to 3 kbp and each segment encodes 1–3 proteins (10–14 proteins in total). Proteins of viruses in the order Reovirales are denoted by the Greek character corresponding to the segment it was translated from (the L segment encodes for λ proteins, the M segment encodes for μ proteins and the S segment encodes for σ proteins).

== Life cycle ==
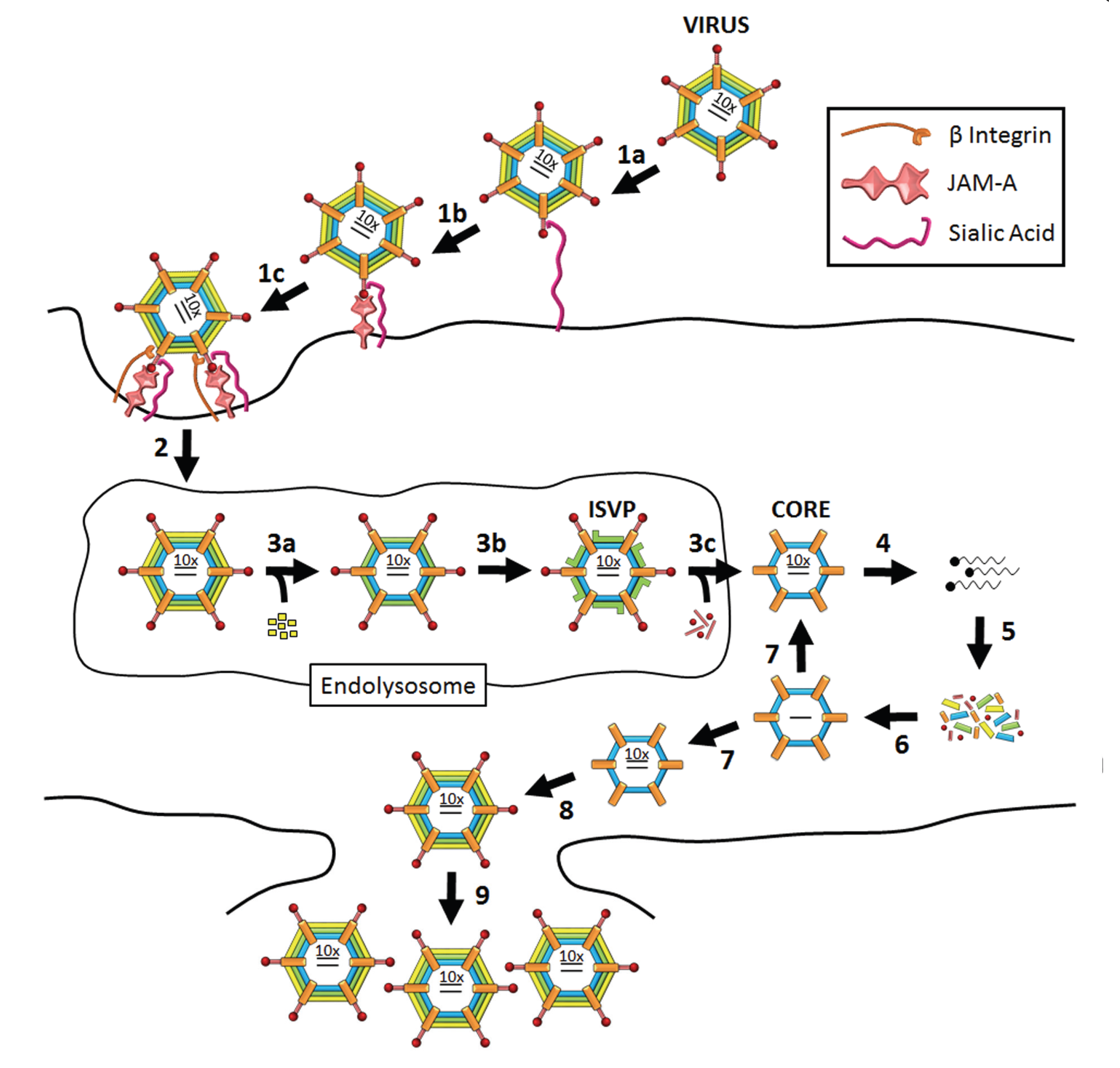
Life cycle of a reovirus

Viruses in the order Reovirales have genomes consisting of segmented, double-stranded RNA (dsRNA). Because of this, replication occurs exclusively in the cytoplasm, and the virus encodes several proteins which are needed for replication and conversion of the dsRNA genome into positive-sense RNAs.

The virus can enter the host cell via a receptor on the cell surface. The receptor is not known but is thought to include sialic acid and junctional adhesion molecules (JAMs). The virus is partially uncoated by proteases in the endolysosome, where the capsid is partially digested to allow further cell entry. The core particle then enters the cytoplasm by a yet unknown process where the genome is transcribed conservatively causing an excess of positive-sense strands, which are used as messenger RNA templates to synthesize negative-sense strands.

The genome of the rotavirus is divided into 11 segments. These segments are associated with the VP1 molecule which is responsible for RNA synthesis. In early events, the selection process occurs so that the entry of the 11 different RNA segments go in the cell. This procedure is performed by newly synthesized RNAs. This event ensures that one each of the 11 different RNA segments is received. In late events, the transcription process occurs again but this time is not capped unlike the early events. For virus different amounts of RNAs are required therefore during the translation step there is a control machinery. There are the same quantities of RNA segments but different quantities of proteins. The reason for this is that the RNA segments are not translated at the same rate.

Viral particles begin to assemble in the cytoplasm 6–7 hours after infection. Translation takes place by leaky scanning, suppression of termination, and ribosomal skipping. The virus exits the host cell by monopartite non-tubule guided viral movement, cell to cell movement, and existing in occlusion bodies after cell death and remaining infectious until finding another host.

== Multiplicity reactivation ==
Multiplicity reactivation (MR) is the process by which two or more virus genomes, each containing inactivating genome damage, can interact within an infected cell to form a viable virus genome. McClain and Spendlove demonstrated MR for three types of reovirus after exposure to ultraviolet irradiation. In their experiments, reovirus particles were exposed to doses of UV-light that would be lethal in single infections. However, when two or more inactivated viruses were allowed to infect individual host cells MR occurred and viable progeny were produced. As they stated, multiplicity reactivation by definition involves some type of repair. Michod et al. reviewed numerous examples of MR in different viruses, and suggested that MR is a common form of sexual interaction in viruses that provides the benefit of recombinational repair of genome damages.

== Taxonomy ==
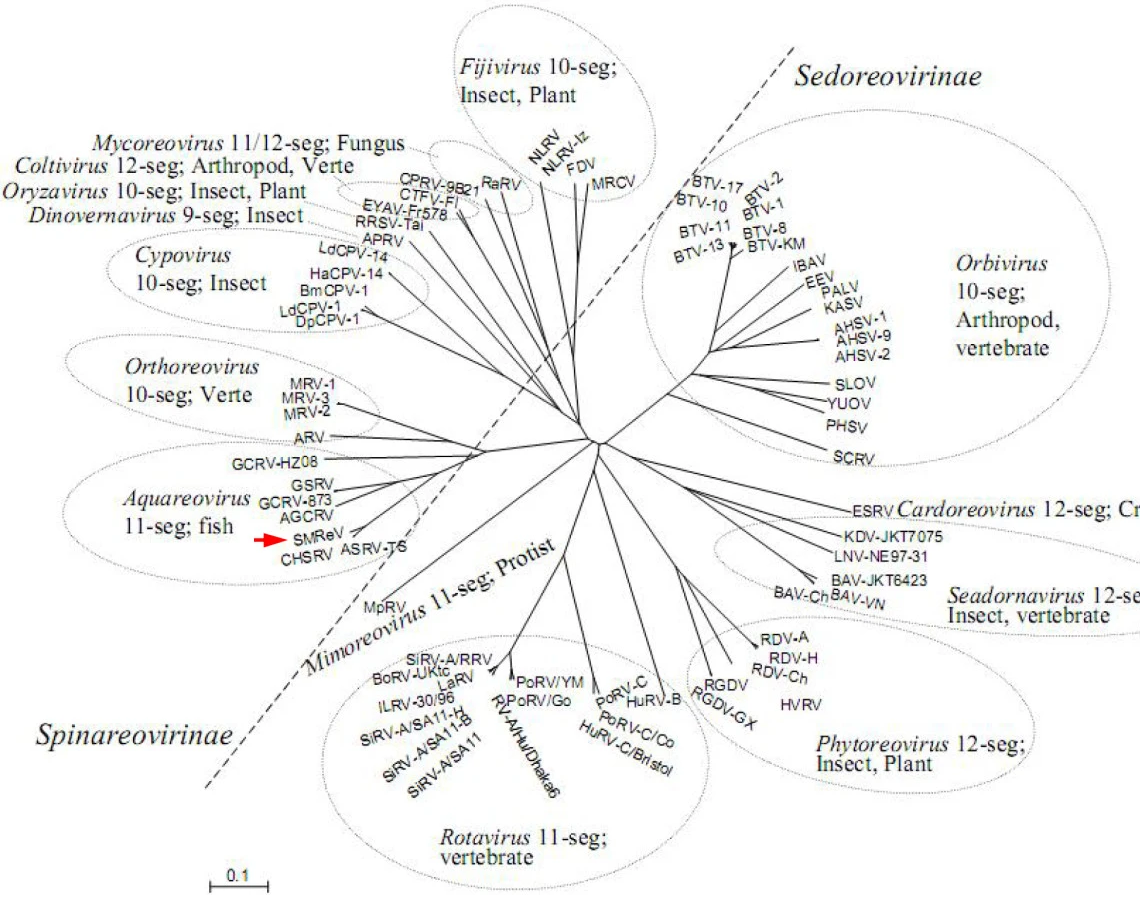
Phylogenetic tree of order Reovirales, dashed line divides family Sedoreoviridae (labelled Sedoreovirinae) and Spinareoviridae (labelled Spinareovirinae)

The order Reovirales is the sole order in the class Resentoviricetes, which belongs to the phylum Duplornaviricota. Reovirales contains two families: Sedoreoviridae and Spinareoviridae.

== Therapeutic applications ==
Although reoviruses are mostly nonpathogenic in humans, these viruses have served as very productive experimental models for studies of viral pathogenesis. Newborn mice are extremely sensitive to reovirus infections and have been used as the preferred experimental system for studies of reovirus pathogenesis.

Reoviruses have been demonstrated to have oncolytic (cancer-killing) properties, encouraging the development of reovirus-based therapies for cancer treatment.

Reolysin is a formulation of reovirus (Mammalian orthoreovirus serotype 3-dearing strain) that is currently in clinical trials for the treatment of various cancers, including studies currently developed to investigate the role of Reolysin combined with other immunotherapies.

== See also ==
- Double-stranded RNA viruses
- Oncolytic virus
- Orphan virus
