= Duplornaviricota =

Virus classification
- (unranked): Virus
- Realm: Riboviria
- Kingdom: Orthornavirae
- Phylum: Duplornaviricota

Classes
- See text

Phylum of viruses

Duplornaviricota is a phylum of RNA viruses, which contains all double-stranded RNA viruses, except for those in phylum Pisuviricota. Characteristic of the group is a viral capsid composed of 60 homo- or heterodimers of capsid protein on a pseudo-T=2 lattice. Duplornaviruses infect both prokaryotes and eukaryotes. The name of the group derives from Italian duplo which means double (a reference to double-stranded), rna for the type of virus, and -viricota which is the suffix for a virus phylum.

== Classes ==
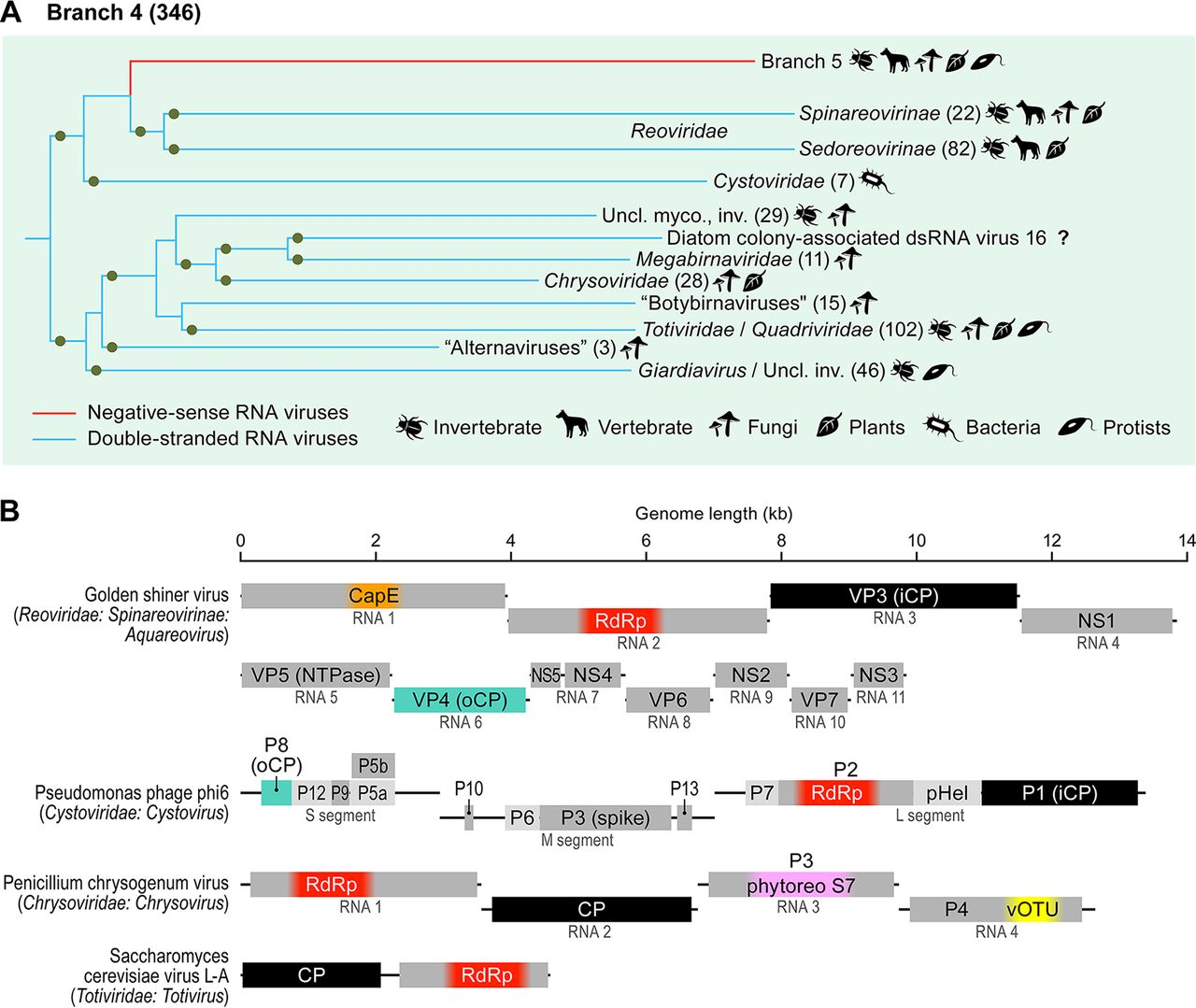
Phylogenetic tree of Duplornaviricota (top), genome of different members and major conserved proteins (bottom)

The following classes are recognized:

- Chrymotiviricetes
- Resentoviricetes
- Vidaverviricetes
