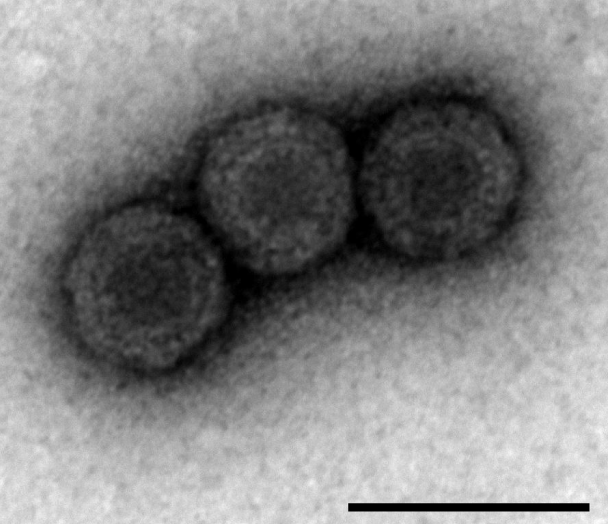
- Analysis of PRV-1 using transmission electron microscopy (scale bar 100 nm).

Virus classification
- (unranked): Virus
- Realm: Riboviria
- Kingdom: Orthornavirae
- Phylum: Duplornaviricota
- Class: Resentoviricetes
- Order: Reovirales
- Family: Spinareoviridae
- Genus: Orthoreovirus
- Species: Piscine orthoreovirus

= Piscine orthoreovirus =

Species of virus

Piscine orthoreovirus (PRV) is a species in the genus Orthoreovirus that infects fish exclusively, PRV was first discovered in 2010 in farmed Atlantic salmon exhibiting heart and skeletal muscle inflammation (HSMI) and has been found present at higher concentration in fish with various diseases. These diseases include HSMI, jaundice syndrome, proliferative darkening syndrome and erythrocytic body inclusion syndrome. PRV is thought to mainly affect aquacultured and maricultured fish stocks, and recent research has been focused around the susceptibility of wild stock. However, whether PRV is virulent with respect to HSMI remains a topic of debate. PRV has been in the public eye mostly due to a potential linkage to farmed Atlantic salmon exhibiting HSMI. Public concern has been raised regarding the possibility of open ocean-net farms transmitting PRV to wild salmon populations and being a factor in declining populations. PRV has not been confirmed to be pathogenic in wild salmon stocks.

== Classification ==
Phylogenetic analysis of each segment of the PRV genome initially placed PRV in the Reoviridae family, subfamily Spinareovirinae, based on sequence and structural similarity to known reoviruses. Upon discovery, phylogenetic sequence analysis indicated PRV was equally related to viruses in the genera Orthoreovirus and Aquareovirus. As a result, it was suggested that PRV evolved separately from a common ancestor related to both Orthoreovirus and Aquareovirus in the subfamily Spinareovirinae.

Currently, PRV is officially classified as an Orthoreovirus. Placement into the genus Orthoreovirus has been argued for the following reasons:

- Higher sequence fidelity within homologous sequences
- The same segment numbers, 10, compared with 11 in Aquareovirus.
- Lack of a fusogenic-associated small transmembrane protein (FAST), a protein that is almost universal in Aquareovirus. This also means that orthoreoviruses do not cause syncytia formation among infected cells.
- Presence of a fiber viral attachment protein
- GC nucleoside percentage of 47%, which falls into the orthoreovirus range (44–48%), rather than the Aquareovirus range (52–60%).

Opposing arguments to placement in Orthoreovirus,

- The only other non-fusogenic orthoreovirus species is mammalian orthoreovirus (MRV), with only mammalian hosts.
- Many aquareoviruses infect fish, while PRV is the only known orthoreovirus that infects fish.
- The S1 and S4 sequences in PRV have no known homologues to either genus.
- Almost all orthoreoviruses and aquareoviruses are bicistronic for their viral attachment protein, while PRV is monocistronic.
- PRV exhibits 5' terminal sequences on its segments that do not align to either genus.
- There have been species of Aquareovirus identified as non-fusogenic, including GCRV104 and GCRVGD108.
- The outer clamp protein of PRV is found on the bicistronic segment S1, the first of any known orthoreovirus or aquareovirus to encode this protein on a polycistronic segment.

== Genome and structure ==
=== Genome ===
Piscine orthoreovirus has a segmented dsRNA genome made up of 10 individual linear segments, cumulatively measuring around 23,600 bp. It has a GC content of 47%. Each segment has conserved terminal sequences. The 3' end sequence (UCAUC-3') is the same as Orthoreovirus and Aquareovirus. The 5' end sequence (5'-GAUAAA/U) is unique to PRV. These segments are referred to as L1-3 (long), M1-3 (medium) and S1-4 (short) based on length and comparison with homologous segments in Orthoreovirus and Aquareovirus. L1 is the longest at 3916 bp and S4 the shortest at 1040 bp.

Eleven proteins are confirmed to be encoded. S1 exhibits bicistronicity with 2 overlapping open reading frames, while the remaining proteins are either confirmed as monocistronic or have been thought to be bicistronic with no further evidence. The proteins that each segment encodes for are as follows, using a standardized naming system across reovirus genera:

- L1-λ3 – Shell protein (inner capsid protein)
- L2-λ2 – Turret protein, guanyltransferase and methyltranferase, genome extrusion
- L3-λ1 – RdRP
- M1-μ2 – NTPase
- M2-μ1 – Outer capsid protein
- M3-μNS – Unknown function, posited to aid in viral factory formation
- S1-σ3 – Outer clamp protein (capsid protein) and p13 – cytotoxic nonstructural protein
- S2-σ2 – Core clamp protein
- S3-σNS – Unknown function, nonstructural
- S4-σ1 – Viral attachment protein

=== Subdivisions ===
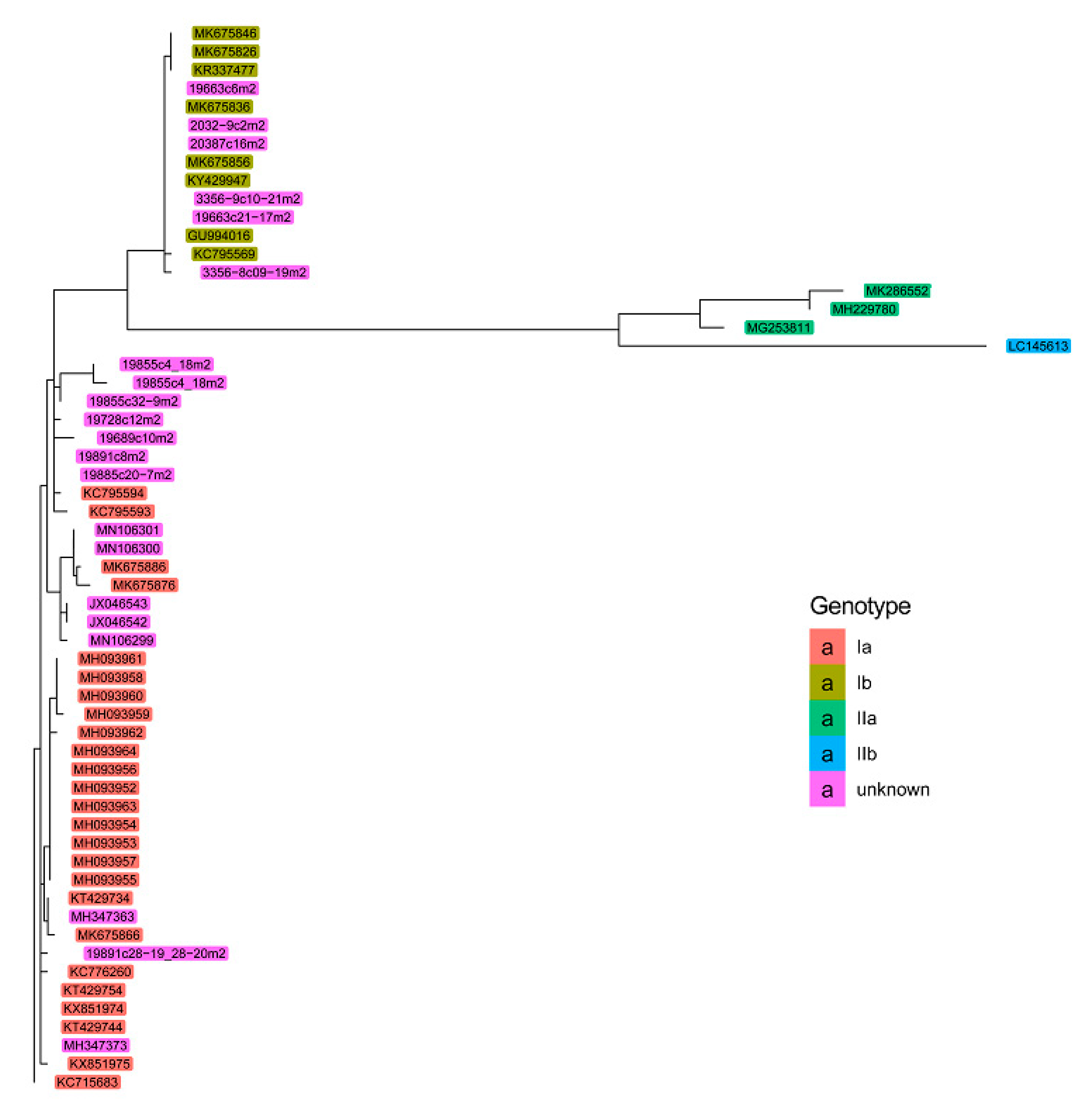
Dendogram of M2 segment nucleotide sequences for different PRV genotypes and subgenotypes.

Piscine orthoreovirus has been grouped into multiple different genotypes based on sequence diversity. Although multiple ways of subdividing PRV have been proposed, the system most often used in the literature subdivides PRV into genotypes I and II, which are further divided into Ia and Ib, and IIa and IIb, respectively. These divisions and subdivisions are based on sequence diversity within segment S1.

==== Genotype I (PRV-1) ====
===== Ia =====
This sub genotype of PRV is found primarily in farmed Atlantic salmon in Norway, Chile and Canada, where it has been transmitted to wild Pacific salmon. It has been associated with populations exhibiting HSMI. It has been found in farmed Chinook salmon in Canada exhibiting jaundice syndrome, as well as farmed rainbow trout and coho showing HSMI-like symptoms in Chile and Canada.

===== Ib =====
This sub genotype of PRV is found primarily in farmed Atlantic and coho salmon in Norway and Chile, additionally being found in farmed rainbow trout in Chile. It has been present in many salmon with HSMI. It has also been found in coho populations exhibiting jaundice syndrome.

==== Genotype II ====
Genotype II was first discovered when comparing the S1 sequences among farmed Atlantic salmon in Chile, and further reiterated with both M2 and whole genome analysis. Despite being within one genotype, the sub genotypes IIa and IIb exhibit much higher inter-sequence diversity than do Ia and Ib.

===== IIa (PRV-3) =====
PRV-3 has been associated with pathological heart lesions in rainbow trout. It has also been found in farmed coho salmon, brown trout, and rainbow trout exhibiting HSMI across Northern Europe and Chile. It has also been found in wild brown trout with proliferative darkening syndrome in Central Europe. Comparison with PRV-2 shows an 80.1% and 90.5% similarity for nucleotides and amino acids, respectively. Comparison with PRV-1 showed a 72.9% similarity in nucleotide sequence and 80.0% amino acid sequence similarity.

===== IIb (PRV-2) =====
PVR-2 has only been found in farmed coho salmon in Japan exhibiting erythrocytic inclusion body syndrome (EIBS). Only one genome of PRV-2 has been sequenced thus far, which has reduced confidence in phylogenetic placements. Comparison with PRV-1 showed a 73.4% and 80.3% similarity in nucleotide sequence and amino acid sequence, respectively.

=== Structure ===
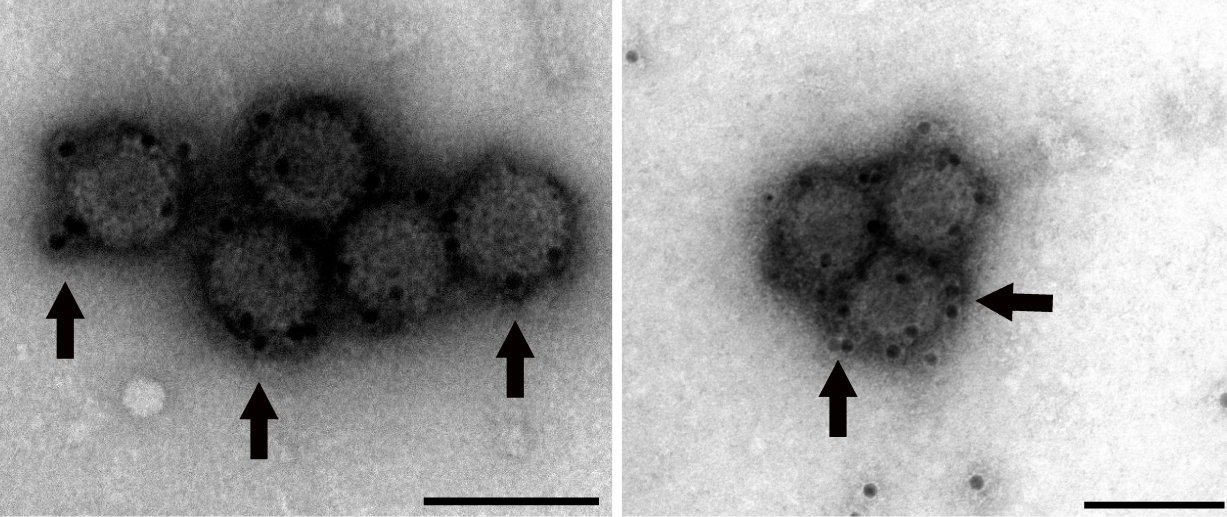
Electrogram image of PRV with immunogold labelled proteins in black arrows. Left: Viral attachment protein (σ1) on outer capsid. Right: Outer clamp protein (σ3) on outer capsid.

As a member of genus Orthoreovirus, the virion form of PRV is a non-enveloped icosahedral capsid with two layers, the outer and core. The diameter of the total virion encompassing the outer layer is approximately 70 nm, with the inner core layer measuring around 39 nm in diameter.

The inner layer consists of the shell protein, λ3, as well as the inner clamp protein σ2, which is thought to play a role in the structural stabilization of the icosahedron. The outer layer is thought to play a stabilizing role for the inner capsid and is made up of μ1 (outer capsid protein) as well as σ3 (outer clamp protein). Additionally, the outer layer has fiber proteins (σ1) that mediate viral attachment and entry into the host.

PRV is a turreted reovirus, exhibiting a turret protein (λ2) on the five-fold axes of its inner capsid icosahedron. The homologous proteins for L2 in MRV and ARV have both guanyltransferase and methyltransferase activity. Although not entirely conserved, the active regions of (λ2) exhibit fidelity to MRV and ARV sequences, suggesting λ2 is the turret protein and that it plays a similar role in the 5' capping of transcribed viral mRNA.

== Discovery ==
PRV was first identified in 2010 via high throughput DNA sequencing and bioinformatics approaches which determined the virus was present in maricultured Atlantic salmon affected by heart and skeletal muscle inflammation (HSMI), and while control of the spread of PRV was advised, a causal relationship between PRV and HSMI was not demonstrated at that time.

In 2012, several wild fish species off the coast of Norway tested positive for PRV indicating that PRV is present in wild populations; however, the majority of sample tests yielded negative results indicating low prevalence of PRV off the Norwegian coast.

There has been speculation that PRV-1a was introduced to the West Coast of North America from a North Atlantic source. PRV-1a was introduced to Chile from North Pacific and North Atlantic sources.

== Distribution ==
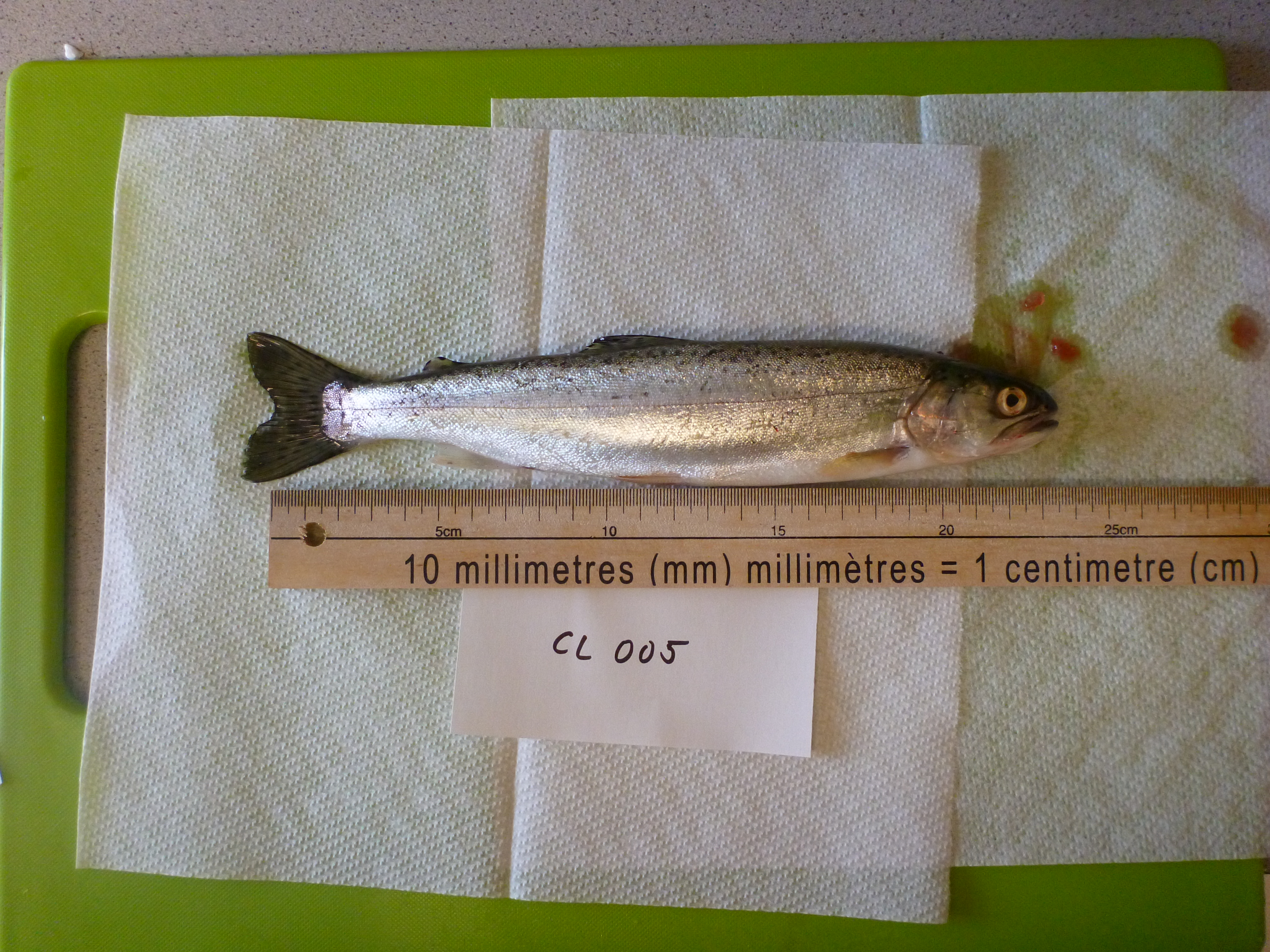
Cutthroat trout that tested positive for PRV in Cultus Lake, British Columbia, Canada

PRV has been found to have a nearly worldwide distribution with various studies detecting the presence of PRV in fisheries in the Atlantic off the coast of the UK, Ireland, and Norway, as well as in both the Atlantic and Pacific coasts off of North and South America. PRV has been detected in Pacific farmed and wild fish species as far north as Alaska, and as far south as Chile.

PRV-1 is less common in wild salmon than it is in farmed salmon, and while wild sea trout tend to exhibit PRV-3 infection, the same can not be said for wild Atlantic salmon populations.

== Interaction with host ==
=== Infection dynamics ===
The kinetics of PRV infection have been identified into three distinct phases:

1. Early host entry, initial replication without host recognition and systemic dissemination of the virus occurs into the blood cells.
  - This stage determines the general course and overall severity of infection in the early replication phase of MRV. To initiate infection, all three PRV genotypes target the erythrocytes of the host. However, viral inclusions within the erythrocytes and systemic viral recognition by the host cells have not been found to occur during this period, which demonstrates that the virus is being shed into the environment at a low degree and that there is a possible lag in replication or infection of different cell types is initially taking place.
2. Peak systemic replication, load-dependent host recognition and cytoplasmic viral inclusion formation then occurs.
  - In this phase, the systemic blood loads of PRV RNA occur at its highest. Substantial shedding of the virus also occurs at this phase, as demonstrated by previous cohabitation challenges. The formed cytoplasmic viral inclusions, characteristic to the Orthoreovirus genus, are found to be similar to ones that develop during the mammalian reovirus infection of prevalent cell lines.
3. Long-term, high-load viral persistence with limited replication occurs, with potential for minor heart inflammation.
  - The duration of this persistence varies depending on the host and/or PRV genotype. Little to no systemic host recognition of PRV occurs and viral inclusions within the erythrocytes disappear. A moderate amount of infectious PRV is still present in the cytoplasm of infected erythrocytes at this late infectious stage, however it is in a reduced or non-replicative state. Shedding of the virus is minimal and may completely stop over time.
  - Heart inflammation can occur early in this phase immediately after the peak viral load or during the infection peak. Depending on many factors, this inflammation can continue on for months, but can disappear even if the PRV infections are still remain.

There are complications in determining the possible outcomes of PRV infection. Each genotype has been shown to lead to circulatory disease; however, high-load PRV infections have also occurred in non-diseased salmon and trout.

== Disease ==
=== PRV and HSMI ===
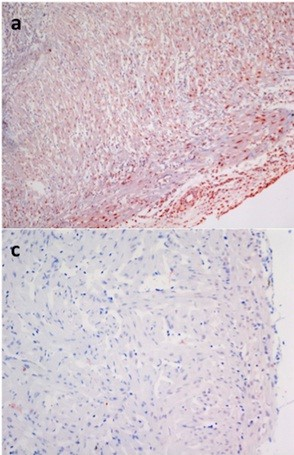
Histopathological assay of PRV (red) in Norwegian farmed Atlantic salmon heart tissue (blue): a) Salmon exhibiting heart and skeletal muscle inflammation (HSMI) c) Healthy salmon.

While Norwegian strains of PRV have led to HSMI outbreaks, it is uncertain if HSMI develops as a result of infection with North American strains of PRV as various salmon and trout have been found to have detectable PRV infections despite an apparent absence of HSMI.

Research in Norway has indicated that injecting tissue from fish exhibiting HSMI into healthy fish leads to HSMI, but this causal relationship seems to be more difficult to demonstrate with PRV variants found off the west coast of Canada. So far, only Atlantic salmon in Norway have had causation proven, while correlation with disease has been found in other cases, but causation has yet to be proven. Wild salmon from British Columbia, such as coho, Chinook and sockeye are susceptible to infection by PRV, and exhibit similar viral loads to farmed Atlantic salmon, but have not been reported to exhibit symptoms of HSMI, although has been reported to be involved in the development of different diseases in chinook (Oncorhynchus tshawytscha) salmon.

=== Disease prevention ===
HSMI is one of the most significant diseases in Atlantic salmon aquaculture in Norway. In efforts to mitigate this disease, attempts have been made to develop vaccines which target PRV-1 using deactivated viral particles, and DNA which codes for proteins with sequences derived from PRV; neither treatment prevented infection with PRV, but the effects of HSMI were lessened with both treatments. Various dietary formulations have been tried in attempts to lower the severity of HSMI, and some efforts have been made to select for fish with genetic variants which confer resistance.

One method of disease prevention may be to disinfect the surface of fish eggs prior to introduction to the farm, as removing PRV from a confined system after the fact requires rigorous disinfection, letting the system rest free of hosts, and thorough regular testing.

== Prevalence in aquaculture ==
PRV has been found to be most prevalent in Europe, and the Americas with relatively few reports in Asia. The prevalence of PRV varies greatly depending on the region and host species. PRV surveillance occurs most significantly in North America and Norway.

=== Europe ===
PRV-1 has been present in Norwegian farmed Atlantic salmon since roughly 1988; within the rest of Europe, PRV is suspected to be common, but reports in some countries remain limited. Iceland has reported finding high PRV-1 prevalence in its Atlantic salmon. In 2018, PRV-3 was reported at brown trout and rainbow trout farms in Denmark and Germany.

=== North America ===
PRV seems to exhibit high infectivity in North America, with a single infected fish often resulting in infection of a farm's entire fish stock. PRV-1 tends to be initially detected following the return of farmed salmon from seawater. It is likely that PRV-1 has been present in North America for decades, or possibly longer.

=== South America ===
In Chile, farmed Atlantic salmon show high rates of PRV-1 infection, while wild fish populations show low rates of infection. Rainbow trout show high rates of infection with PRV-1.

=== Asia ===
Within Asia, PRV-2 has only been found in Japan and it has been linked to erythrocytic inclusion body syndrome (EIBS) in farmed coho salmon.

=== Host range ===
PRV has been found in a range of aquacultured/wild host species such as:

- Cutthroat trout (Oncorhynchus clarkii)
- Chinook salmon (Oncorhynchus tshawytscha)
- Sockeye salmon (Oncorhynchus nerka)
- Rainbow trout (Oncorhynchus mykiss)
- Coho salmon (Oncorhynchus kisutch)
- Chum salmon (Oncorhynchus keta)
- Pink salmon (Oncorhynchus gorbusca)
- Atlantic salmon (Salmo salar)
- Sea-trout (Salmo trutta)
- Great silver smelt (Argentina silus)
- Atlantic horse mackerel (Trachurus trachurus)
- Atlantic herring (Clupea harengus)
- Capelin (Mallotus villosus)
