= Southern rice black-streaked dwarf virus =

Virus classification
- (unranked): Virus
- Realm: Riboviria
- Kingdom: Orthornavirae
- Phylum: Duplornaviricota
- Class: Resentoviricetes
- Order: Reovirales
- Family: Spinareoviridae
- Genus: Fijivirus
- Species: Fijivirus boryzae

Species of virus

Southern rice black-streaked dwarf virus (SRBSDV) is a plant pathogenic virus of the family Sedoreoviridae, causing diseases in rice and maize, resulting in significant crop losses in Southern Asian countries. It is a member of the genus Fijivirus. It is not to be confused with the Rice black-streaked dwarf virus, as this virus does not contain the same insect vectors, and is an entirely separate virus. The sole transmitter of SRBSDV is Sogatella furcifera, aka the "white-backed planthopper" (WBPH). Close relative to the Laodelphax striatellus (small brown planthopper), which transmits the RBSD virus.

== Transmission ==
The SRBSDV spreads via the WBPH, the sole transmitter of this virus. The insect picks up the virus when feeding on an infected plant, proceeding to spread it to other plants.

== Affected areas ==
SRBSDV was first found in southern China in 2001. Since then, it has spread to other parts of East Asia, causing serious damage to rice and maize crops in countries like China, Vietnam, and Japan.

Most affected countries have already implemented preventative actions, such as nets to protect crops, treating seeds with chemicals, and spraying seedlings with pesticides. Scientists are also trying to create rice and maize plants that are naturally resistant to the virus.
