= Abney virus =

Virus classification
- (unranked): Virus
- Realm: Riboviria
- Kingdom: Orthornavirae
- Phylum: Duplornaviricota
- Class: Resentoviricetes
- Order: Reovirales
- Family: Spinareoviridae
- Genus: Orthoreovirus
- Species: Mammalian orthoreovirus
- Serotype: Mammalian orthoreovirus 3
- Strain: Abney virus

Species of virus

The Abney virus is a virus, isolated from an anal swab of a seventeen-month-old African-American child named Abney who, while living within the care of an institution began suffering an upper respiratory illness, which became a prototype strain of Orthoreovirus type 3. The virus was isolated in children, in Washington, from October 1955 to February 1956, 26 of the 34 children showed evidence of the reovirus Type 3 infection.

The isolated strain was one of five such strains found during the study, each isolated from the same child in successive cultures in September 1957. The isolated virus showed resistance to Ethyl Ether, among other traits similar to the other Orthoreoviruses. At the time of isolation, no causal relationship between the virus and any illness was established, however, modern studies of other Orthoreoviruses have established a connection.
