= Avian orthoreovirus =

Virus classification
- (unranked): Virus
- Realm: Riboviria
- Kingdom: Orthornavirae
- Phylum: Duplornaviricota
- Class: Resentoviricetes
- Order: Reovirales
- Family: Spinareoviridae
- Genus: Orthoreovirus
- Species: Avian orthoreovirus

Species of virus

Avian orthoreovirus, also known as avian reovirus, is an orthoreovirus from the Reoviridae family. Infection causes arthritis and tenosynovitis in poultry. It can also cause respiratory disease.

Avian orthoreovirus infection is more common in young birds, because resistance begins to develop from as young as two weeks of age. It is also reportedly more common in broilers. Distribution of avian orthoreovirus is worldwide and it is present in most poultry flocks. It can be transmitted horizontally via the faeces or rarely, vertically. It is not a zoonosis.

The most common symptom is lameness. There may also be swelling or bleeding around the joints. Gastrointestinal, respiratory and neurological signs have also been reported.

Presumptive diagnoses may be made based on the observation of clinical signs. They can be confirmed using virus isolation, complement fixation, ELISA, immunodiffusion or histopathology (following postmortem exam).

== Description ==
Avian reovirus belongs to the genus Orthoreovirus, and Reoviridae family. They are non-enveloped viruses that undergo replication in the cytoplasm of infected cells. It has icosahedral symmetry and contains a double-shelled arrangement of surface protein. Virus particles can range between 70 and 80 nm. Morphologically, the virus is a double stranded RNA virus that is composed of ten segments. The genome and proteins that are encoded by the genome can be separated into three different sizes ranging from small, medium, or large. Of the eleven proteins that are encoded for by the genome, two are nonstructural, while the remaining nine are structural.

Avian reoviruses can withstand a pH range of 3.0–9.0. Ambient temperatures are suitable for the survival of these viruses, which become inactive at 56 °C in less than an hour. Common areas where this virus can survive include galvanized metal, glass, rubber, feathers, and wood shavings. Avian reovirus can survive for up to ten days on these common areas in addition to up to ten weeks in water.

Cultivation and observation of the effects of avian reovirus is most often performed in chicken embryos. If infected into the yolk sac, the embryo will succumb to death accompanied by hemorrhaging of the embryos and cause the foci on the liver to appear yellowish-green. There are several primary chicken cell cultures/areas that are susceptible to avian reoviruses, which include the lungs, liver, kidney, and fibroblasts of the chick embryo. Of the following susceptible areas, liver cells from the chick embryo have been found to be the most sensitive for primary isolation from clinical material. Typically, the CPE effect of avian reoviruses is the production of syncytia. CPE, or cytopathic effects are the visible changes in a host cell that takes place because of viral infection. Syncytia is a single cell or cytoplasmic mass containing several nuclei, formed by fusion of cells or by division of nuclei.

== Genome structure ==
The complete genome sequence of avian reovirus is 23,494 bp long and is broken up into 10 segments. The full lengths of each segment are L1 (3,959 nt), L2 (3,830 nt), L3 (3,907 nt), M1 (2,283 nt), M2 (2,158 nt), M3 (1,996 nt), S1 (1,643 nt), S2 (1,324 nt), S3 (1,202 nt), and S4 (1,192 nt). There are 10 proteins that are also involved in the composition of this virus. The lengths of these structural and non-structural proteins are λa (1,293 amino acids), λB (1,259 aa), λC (1,285 aa), μA (732 aa), μB (676 aa), μNS (635 aa), σC (326 aa), σA (416 aa), σB (367 aa), and σNS (367 aa).

== Virus-host interactions ==
Alpha and beta interferons belong to a family of multifunctional cytokines, which are expressed and activated/distributed by fibroblasts and leukocytes in response to infections. In an experiment where primary cultures of chicken embryo fibroblasts were treated with alpha/beta interferon, results indicated that this interaction induced an antiviral state that strongly inhibited vaccinia and vesicular stomatitis virus (VSV) replication, but didn't have an effect on avian reovirus, specifically the replication of the S1133 strain. Instead, extracts of cells that were infected with avian-reovirus were able to block the activation of dsRNA-dependent enzymes, enabling the virus to relieve the translation-inhibitory activity of dsRNA. Also, protein σA, which is a core protein of the S1133 strain, binds to dsRNA irreversibly. Removing this protein from this particular viral strain disables the posttranslational capacity of infected cells. Research has shown that this core protein may possibly disrupt the IFN-induced cellular response against avian reovirus through the blockage of enzyme pathways that are dependent on dsRNA.

In addition to the possible disruption of IFN-induced cellular responses, chicken embryo fibroblasts that are infected with strain S1133 have displayed significant cytopathic effects. Strain S1133 led to the activation of the intracellular death in the early stages of infection. Although viral gene expression is not necessary, intracellular viral uncoating is the significant process that induces apoptosis. The ability of avian reovirus to induce apoptosis is not restricted to a distinct cell type of virus strain due to the fact that several different isolates of this pathogen could induce apoptosis in different mammalian and avian cell lines. Apoptosis can also be induced in cells that are infected with UV-irradiated reovirus virions and cells infected with ribavirin-treated avian reovirus, which suggests that viral mRNA synthesis and crucial steps that occur during viral replication are not necessary for induction of apoptosis in infected cells. Disregarding infectivity, the number of inoculated virus particles is the significant factor that leads to apoptosis from avian reovirus. Induced apoptosis is stopped when intracellular viral uncoating is blocked.

== Diseases ==
There are several diseases that are caused by avian reovirus, which includes, avian arthritis/tenosynovitis, runting-stunting syndrome, and blue wing disease in chickens. Blue wing disease affects young broiler chickens and has an average mortality rate of 10%. It causes intramuscular and subcutaneous hemorrhages and atrophy of the spleen, bursa of Fabricius, and thymus. When young chickens are experimentally infected with avian reovirus, it is spread rapidly throughout all tissues. This virus is spread most frequently in the skin and muscles, which is also the most obvious site for lesions. Avian arthritis causes significant lameness in joints, specifically the hock joints. In the most severe cases, viral arthritis has caused the tendon to rupture. Chickens that have contracted runting-stunting syndrome cause a number of individuals in a flock to appear noticeably small due to its delayed growth. Diseased chicks are typically pale, dirty, wet, and may have a distending abdomen. Some individuals may display “helicopter-like” feathers in their wings and other feather abnormalities. The virus has also been shown to cause osteoporosis.

=== Mechanism ===
The most common route of infection occurs orally, and occasionally through the respiratory tract from the nucleus of congenitally infected hatch mates. Experimental infection of adult chickens through the esophagus, nasal passages, or trachea caused the virus to spread throughout all areas of the enteric, respiratory tract, reproductive tract, and the hock and tendon joints. In an experiment, avian reovirus was recovered from mononuclear, plasma, and erythrocyte cell fractions of blood within 30 hours of infection in young chicks. After 3–5 days, the infection spread throughout the whole body. The main site of viral replication was observed in the enteric tract. A different study of early pathogenesis in chicks infected with virus one day after birth displayed that the bursa of Fabricius and the epithelial cells of the small intestines are the main sites of infection and portal of entry of the virus which quickly disseminates to other organs within a 24- to 48-hour window post infection. The tibiotarsal-tarsometatarsal (hock joint) was the site where virus replication caused the most severe damage and in some extreme cases, tendon rupture.

=== Immune responses ===
==== Humoral antibodies ====
The sera of birds infected with avian reovirus display circulating antibodies through the validation of ELISA, agar gel immunodiffusion, indirect immunofluorescence (IIF), and virus neutralization (VN). Virus neutralization identifies type-specific antibodies, which allows for differentiation between strains of viruses through their distinct antigens. The other four tests detect group antigens.

==== Maternal antibodies ====
Maternal antibodies have displayed protection against the development of microscopic lesions of tenosynovitis in chicks that have been infected one day after birth. Protection provided by maternal antibodies has served as a foundation of breeder vaccination.

==== Cell-mediated immunity ====
An experiment that used monoclonal antibodies that were specific for chick Ia (a chicken class II major histocompatibility complex antigen), and T and B-lymphocytes were observed to determine its effects on cellular infiltrates during the development of reovirus arthritis. Within the synovium collected, plasma cells and T-lymphocytes were the primary inflammatory cells present. During the acute-phase, CD8 cells were present in low numbers. The most activity was observed during the subacute phase with an increase in CD8 and CD4 lymphocytes. At this phase, clusters of IgM-positive, B-cells, T-cells, and plasma cells were also observed. During the chronic phase, a high amount of CD4 T- cells and a few IgM-positive B-cells were observed.

==== Immunosuppression ====
Infections of chickens with avian reovirus doesn't disrupt the functional capabilities of their T-cells, but induces suppressor macrophages that inhibit T-cell function.

=== Diagnosis ===
Although infection of avian reovirus is spread worldwide, it is rarely the sole cause of a disease. For chickens, the most common manifestation of the disease is joint/limb lameness. Confirming infection of avian reovirus can be detected through an ELISA test by using and observing the expression of σC and σB proteins. However, isolating and identifying reoviruses from tissue samples is very time-consuming. Isolation is most successfully attained through inoculation of material into chick embryo cultures or fertile chicken eggs. Inoculation of embryonic eggs through the yolk sac has shown that the virus usually kills the embryos within 5 or 6 days post inoculation. Analyzing the samples, the embryos appeared hemorrhagic and necrotic lesions on the liver were present. There have also been approaches to identify avian reoviruses molecularly by observing infected tissues with dot-blot hybridization, PCR, and a combination of PCR and RFLP. This combination allows for the reovirus strain to be typed.

=== Prevention ===
Vaccines are available (ATCvet codes: QI01AA04 (WHO) for the inactivated vaccine, QI01AD10 (WHO) for the live vaccine, plus various combinations). Given that avian reovirus infections are widespread, the viruses are relatively resistant outside the host, and that vertical and horizontal transmission occurs, eradicating avian reovirus infection in commercial chicken flocks is very unlikely. In addition, absence of detectable seroconversion and failure to detect virus in cloacal swabs are unreliable indicators of resisting infection, or transmission via the egg. Thus, the most proactive and successful approach to controlling this disease is through vaccination. Since chicks are more prone to being detrimentally affected by the disease right after hatching, vaccine protocols that use live and killed vaccines are designed to provide protection during the very early stages of life. This approach has been accomplished through active immunity after early vaccination and a live vaccine or passive immunity from maternal antibodies followed with vaccination of the breeder hens. Currently, efforts toward administering inactivated or live vaccines to breeding stock to allow passive immunity to the offspring via the yolk are being taken.

=== Epidemiology ===
Avian reovirus can be transmitted both vertically and horizontally. Egg transmission has been observed after experimental infection, however the rate of transmission is very low. Congenitally infected chicks are assumed to act as a nucleus of infection for the rest of the hatch due to their high probability of becoming infected through the fecal-oral route or through the respiratory tract. Infection may also enter through the exposure of broken skin of the feet or legs of the chickens, where it then can become established in the hock joints. Once the infection has entered the body, avian reovirus can survive in the tissues of chickens for many weeks. Resistance to reovirus infections in chickens is directly related to age. Chicks that are infected one day after birth are more prone to experimentally synthesized tenosynovitis/arthritis than those that were infected at two weeks or older. Chicks that were infected a day after birth also displayed a development of more severe joint lesions and higher intestinal virus titers than those who were infected at two weeks of age. Infectious agents, which increase the pathogenicity of reovirus in the joints of chicken, include Mycoplasma synoviae, Staphylococcus aureus, infectious bursal disease virus, and chicken anemia virus. Avian reoviruses are also typically resistant to certain disinfectants.
