= Maize rough dwarf virus =

Virus classification
- (unranked): Virus
- Realm: Riboviria
- Kingdom: Orthornavirae
- Phylum: Duplornaviricota
- Class: Resentoviricetes
- Order: Reovirales
- Family: Spinareoviridae
- Genus: Fijivirus
- Species: Fijivirus zeae

Synonyms
- virus del nanismo ruvido del mais

Species of virus

Maize rough dwarf virus (MRDV) is a plant pathogenic virus of the family Spinareoviridae.
