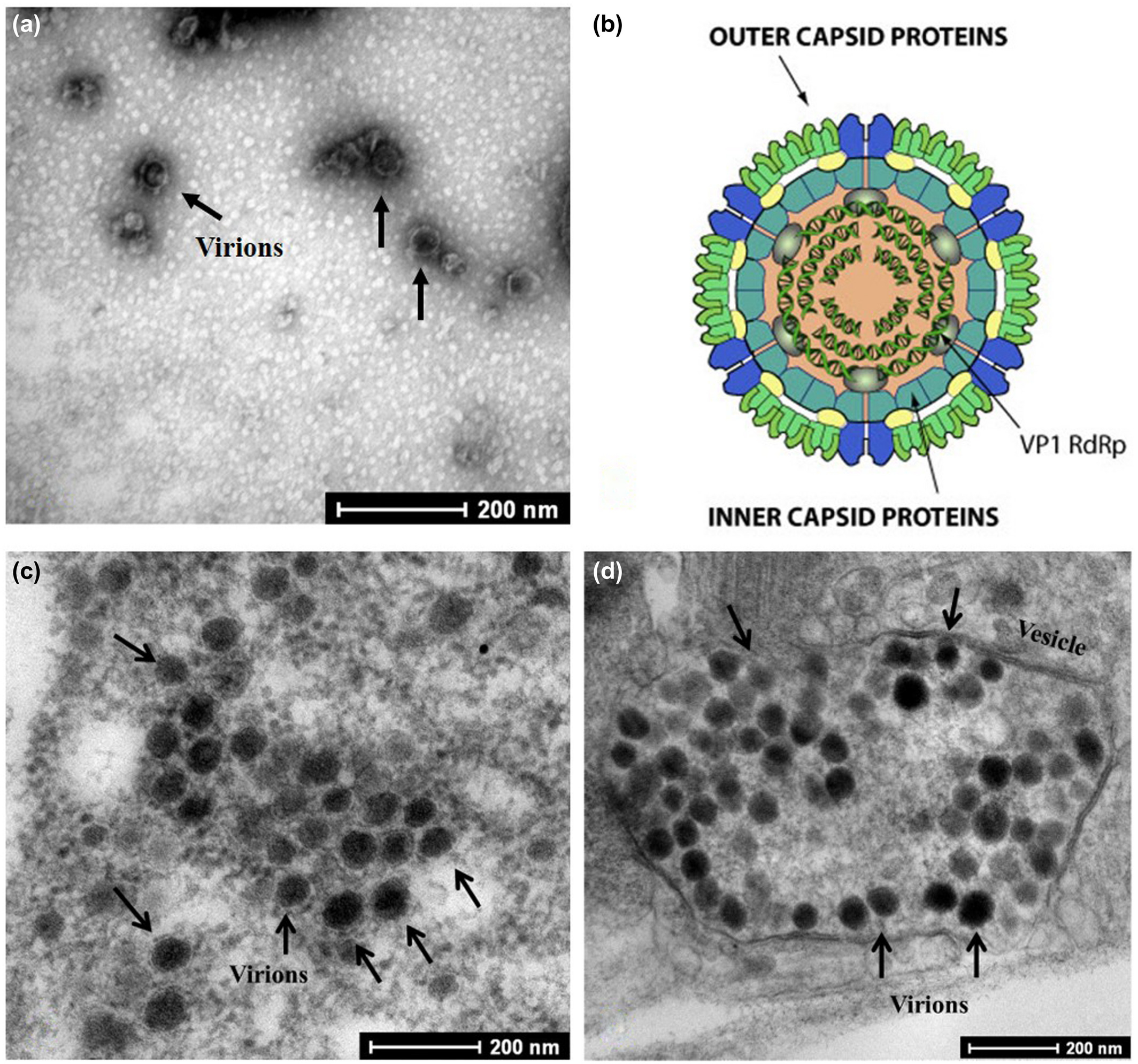

Virus classification
- (unranked): Virus
- Realm: Riboviria
- Kingdom: Orthornavirae
- Phylum: Duplornaviricota
- Class: Resentoviricetes
- Order: Reovirales
- Family: Spinareoviridae
- Genus: Fijivirus
- Species: Fijivirus alporyzae

Synonyms
- Rice black streak virus

= Rice black-streaked dwarf virus =

Species of virus

Rice black-streaked dwarf virus (RBSDV) is a plant pathogenic virus of the family Spinareoviridae, causing diseases in rice and maize, causing significant crop losses in East Asian countries.

Not to be confused with the southern rice black-streaked dwarf virus, as this virus does not contain the same insect vectors. The sole transmitter of RBSDV is Laodelphax striatellus, the small brown planthopper (SBPH).

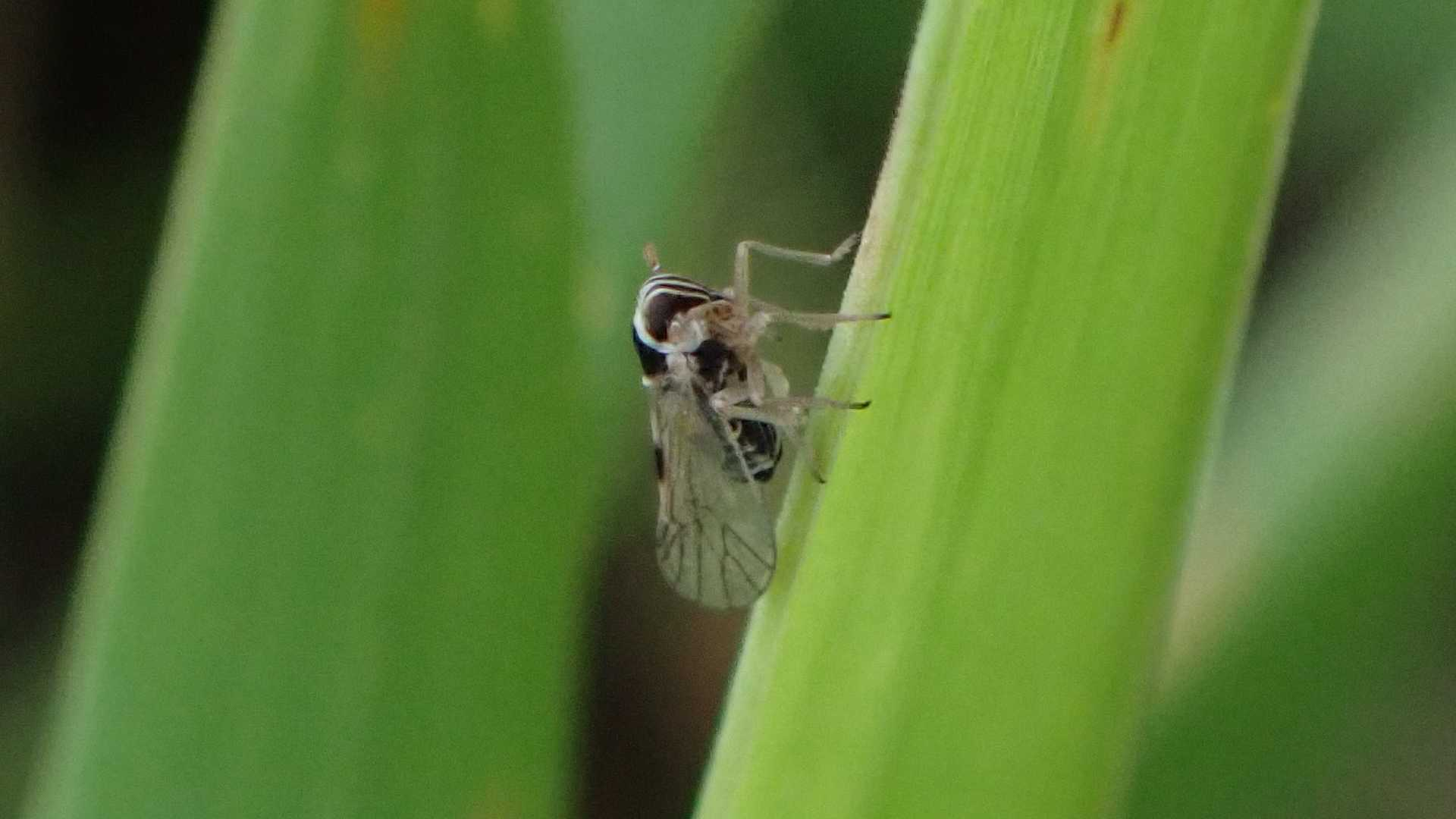
Laodelphax striatellus on crop

== Affected areas ==
RBSDV primarily affects regions in East and Southeast Asia, particularly countries such as China, Vietnam, South Korea, Japan, and Thailand. Affected countries are dependent on the migration patterns of L. striatellus.

== Preventative actions ==
China has been significantly affected by RBSDV and has implemented various control measures, such as seedbed coverage, chemical seed treatments, and chemical spraying of seedlings. Researchers in China are also actively screening for effective anti-RSBDV drugs and investigating further preventative measures (2013).

While specific measures may not be detailed, we can assume that heavily impacted countries such as Vietnam are taking similar actions.
