= Oat sterile dwarf virus =

Virus classification
- (unranked): Virus
- Realm: Riboviria
- Kingdom: Orthornavirae
- Phylum: Duplornaviricota
- Class: Resentoviricetes
- Order: Reovirales
- Family: Spinareoviridae
- Genus: Fijivirus
- Species: Fijivirus avenae

Synonyms
- Arrhenatherum blue dwarf virus; Lolium enation virus

Species of virus

Oat sterile dwarf virus (OSDV) is a plant pathogenic virus of the family Spinareoviridae.
