= Mammalian orthoreovirus =

Virus classification
- (unranked): Virus
- Realm: Riboviria
- Kingdom: Orthornavirae
- Phylum: Duplornaviricota
- Class: Resentoviricetes
- Order: Reovirales
- Family: Spinareoviridae
- Genus: Orthoreovirus
- Species: Mammalian orthoreovirus

Serotypes
- Mammalian orthoreovirus 1; Mammalian orthoreovirus 2; Mammalian orthoreovirus 3; Abney virus; Mammalian orthoreovirus 4

Species of virus

Mammalian orthoreovirus (MRV) is a double-stranded RNA virus. It is a part of the family Reoviridae, as well as the subfamily Spinareovirinae. As seen in the name, the Mammalian Ortheoreovirus infects numerous mammalian species and vertebrates which serve as natural hosts. Some diseases that occur as a result of this virus or are associated with this virus include mild upper respiratory illness, and gastrointestinal illness. Examples of these are: upper respiratory tract syndromes, gastroenteritis (stomach flu), biliary atresia, obstructive hydrocephalus, jaundice, alopecia, conjunctivitis, and ‘oily hair’ associated with steatorrhea.

There are four serotypes, or distinct variations within the viral species, of Mammalian orthoreovirus. This means that there are four separate strains of Mammalian orthoreovirus: Type 1 Lang, Type 2 Jones, Type 3 Dearing, Type 4 Ndelle. An example of these strains is Mammalian orthoreovirus type 3, or Mammalian orthoreovirus 3-Dearing (MRV-3; Strain Dearing). It induces cell death preferentially in transformed cells and therefore displays inherent oncolytic properties.

It is believed that Mammalian orthoreovirus causes subclinical infection in humans more so than in other mammals. Meaning, that a human infected with Mammalian orthoreovirus, regardless of the serotype, is nearly or completely asymptomatic, and therefore, don't exhibit signs or symptoms of the virus. This theory is based upon evidence that the majority of people have antibodies for all of the serotypes, meaning they were exposed to the virus at some point and the body's immune system built an immunity to it after being infected. A 2024 study documented a case of MRV-3 with novel reassortments in a human traveler returning to South Africa from Thailand, demonstrating the potential for international travel to spread MRV between regions and highlighting its continued circulation in human populations.

== Viral classification ==
Baltimore Classification

Based upon the Baltimore classification scheme, the Mammalian orthoreovirus is a Group III virus. This is because the Mammalian orthoreovirus is a double stranded RNA virus, and as stated previously, a part of the Reovirus family. The name “Reo-“is derived from respiratory enteric orphan diseases. The term “orphan diseases” makes reference to the fact that some Reoviruses were not known to be associated with any diseases at the time of their discovery. The Reoviridae family is also characterized with "naked", icosahedral capsids and 10-12 segments of linear double stranded RNA. “Naked” meaning the icosahedral capsid is not surrounded by a viral envelope.

Within the Reoviridae family the Mammalian orthoreovirus is a part of the Spinareovirinae subfamily. This is based on the fact that viruses within this subfamily, such as the Mammalian orthoreovirus, Aquareovirus, Coltivirus, Cypovirus, etc., have the presence of a turreted protein on the inner capsid.

== History ==
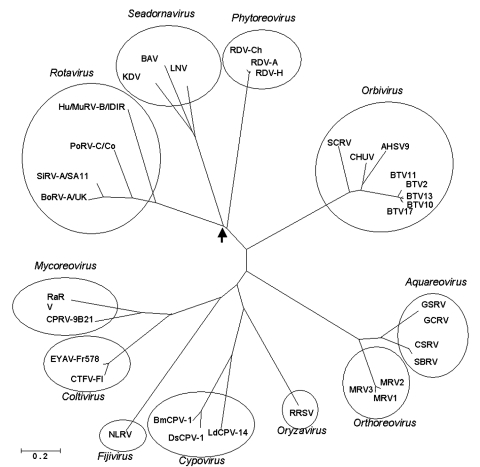
Phylogenetic comparison of the viral polymerase protein sequences of viruses of the family Reoviridae.

The etymology of the Mammalian orthoreovirus is based upon “ortho-“ translated from Greek as “straight” and “reovirus“ from respiratory enteric orphan virus. The Mammalian orthoreovirus was labeled an orphan virus in the 1950s when it was discovered. It was described as a “ubiquitous presence” in mammals meaning it was found virtually everywhere. Serum surveys conducted in the 1950s found neutralizing antibodies to mammalian orthoreovirus in humans, monkeys, rabbits and guinea pigs. More recent studies suggest that MRV is still a ubiquitous presence in humans. The Mammalian orthoreovirus is well researched and understood on the biochemical and structural levels, additionally their pathogenesis in mice serves as a model system for studying the pathogenesis of the reoviruses in general. The Orthoreovirus genus is subdivided into fusogenic and non-fusogenic. The division is based upon fusogenic orthoreoviruses having the ability to cause fusion of infected cells, resulting in multinucleated cellular syncytia. These fusogenic orthoreoviruses encode a fusion-associated small transmembrane (FAST) protein that is plays a role in this ability. Prototypical Mammailian orthoreovirsus are non-fusogenic, and do not produce syncytia because of the lack of the fusion-associated transmembrane protein.

The Mammalian orthoreovirus serotypes have been studied significantly at the antigenetic and sequence levels. Serotypes 1 (Lang), 2 (Jones), and 3 (Dearing) were originally recognized based upon virus neutralization and hemaglutination-inhibition profiles. Serotype 4 (Ndelle) have been studied at the antigenetic and molecular levels.

== Structure and genome ==
Just as the rest of the reoviruses are structured, the Mammalian orthoreovirus contains a segmented genome with a linear genomic arrangement, which is enclosed in a 70-80 nm double layered protein capsid, made up of an inner (T=2) and outer layer (T=13). The viral core of MRV, and orthoreoviruses alike, consist of an inner capsid layer plus its enclosed viral genome. The Mammalian orthoreovirus double stranded RNA genome contains 10 segments divided into three size classes (small, medium, and large) based upon their characteristic mobility during gel electrophoresis. The genome has three large segments, (L1, L2, and L3) which encode for λ (lambda) proteins; three medium segments (M1, M2, and M3) that encode for μ (mu) proteins; and four small segments (S1, S2, S3, and S4) which encode for σ (sigma) proteins. In total, the genome size is approximately 23,500 base pairs.

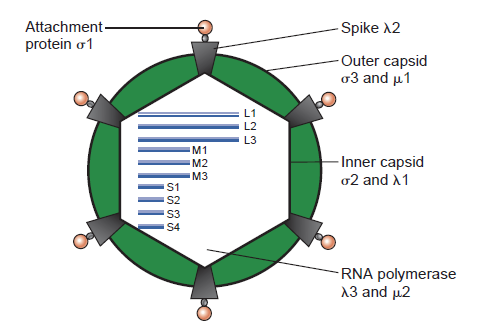
Structure of Mammalian orthoreovirus

Generally, these double stranded RNA genome segments contain a single gene encoding a single protein, although there are some exceptions. The S1 genome segment of the non-fusogenic reoviruses (e.g., Mammalian orthoreovirus) encode the σ1 cell attachment protein. Contained with the σ1 gene is a second, smaller open reading frame encoding the non-structural σ1s. Reovirus double stranded RNA, cannot serve as a template for protein translation or as messenger RNA (mRNA). Because of the nature of double stranded RNA, double stranded RNA viruses such as reoviruses, and the Mammalian orthoreovirus must carry and/or encode the necessary enzymes within their virions in order to first transcribe their genome, producing mRNA, and delivering their infectious mRNA into the cytoplasm of the host cell. The double stranded RNA viral core, which plays an important role in packaging the genome and the transcription of mRNA as well as maturation, contain proteins which are present across the entire Type 3 double stranded RNA group. In the outer capsid layer, the proteins take part in the role of environmental stability, and cell attachment to a number of hosts, which are quite variable even within the same Orthoreovirus genus.

The internal structure of MRV has been fully reconstructed. λ3 is the RNA replicase, whereas μ2 is a transcription factor.

== Replication cycle ==
As stated in the beginning of the article, the natural hosts of the Mammalian orthoreovirus are mammals, ranging from pigs to humans, and the majority of all mammalian species. This is why the Mammalian orthoreovirus is described as a ubiquitous presence, because antibodies for one (or more) serotypes have been found in virtually every mammalian species. This is at least partially due to because the Mammalian orthoreovirus does not rely on arthropods for transmission as many viruses do. Instead the Mammalian orthoreovirus is transmitted via the oral-fecal route, meaning in some way an infected host's feces are ingested by another person, or the aerosol route, meaning the viral particles travel through the air and are breathed in by a person.

=== Entry into cell ===
Once inside the person the Mammalian orthoreovirus attaches to target cells via the σ1 protein, a filamentous trimer that protrudes from the outer capsid layer. Junctional adhesion molecule-A is a receptor for the Mammalian orthoreovirus regardless of the serotype. Sialic acid, resident within the respiratory system of most mammals is a co-receptor for Mammalian orthoreovirus Type 3 (Dearing). After binding to the receptors on the surface of the to-be host cell, the virus is brought into the cell via receptor-mediated endocytosis. Following the internalization of the virus, the viral outer capsid is disassembled within the endocytic compartment (the vesicle). This disassembly of the outer capsid of the virus is performed by endocytic proteases, during acidic pH conditions. This leads to the removal of the σ3 protein, resulting in the exposure of micro1, a membrane-penetration mediator, as well as a conformational change in the σ1 attachment protein.

==== Replication and transcription ====
After the uncoated virus particles penetrate the endosomes, early transcription of the double stranded RNA genome by viral polymerase occurs inside the uncoated (naked) viral core. This process occurs in this manner so the viral double stranded RNA is not exposed to the cytoplasm, as this would cause the cell to attack the viral particle. The viral core is then released into the cytoplasm of the host cell, where replication occurs. Replication is completed with the aid of protein λ3, which acts as RNA-dependent RNA polymerase. Positive-strand transcripts from each of the double stranded RNA segments are synthesized, these transcripts are then used as templates for the translation of proteins, in addition to make the negative-strand RNA. Viral protein μ2, is a transcriptase cofactor that is a part of transcription, it also has enzymatic functions such as capping the mRNA, and acts as RNA helicase, which separates double stranded RNA strands.

===== Assembly and release =====
Mammalian orthoreovirus messenger RNA transcripts have a short 5’ untranslated region, and do not have 3’ poly A tails, some lack 5’ caps during post-infection. It is unknown as to how uncapped versions of MRV's mRNA are able to use a host cell ribosome in translation. Mammalian orthoreovirus’ viral proteins and its genomic RNAs aggregate in cytoplasm viral factories. The positive and negative RNA stands will base pair to create the double stranded RNA viral genome. The virion is assembled in sub-viral particles in the cytoplasm. Due to the nature of the Mammalian orthoreovirus, its outer (T=13) and inner (T=2) capsid are self-assembled. The inner capsid proteins require the co-expression of the T2 protein and the σ2 protein, to stabilize the inner capsid structure as well as aid in assembly. The outer capsid's assembly is dependent upon the σ3 viral protein, which aids in the formation of the icosahedral capsid. After the virus has been fully assembled and matured, the newly formed Mammalian orthoreovirus particle is released from the host cell, the means in which the virus particle does this is uncertain but it is presumed to happen following cell death and the breakdown of the host plasma membrane.

== Interaction with hosts ==
The Mammalian orthoreovirus as stated previously is ubiquitous among mammals, infecting a large variety of species all over the world. Examples include, pigs, cattle, horses, primates, dogs, cats, rabbits, mice, marsupials, and humans. Experimental infection of Mammalian orthoreovirus Type 3 resulted in 100% mortality in neonatal pigs, the pigs developed acute gastroenteritis and severe diarrhea within 72 hours of infection. Additionally, it has been reported that MRV-3 causes enteritis, pneumonia, encephalitis and reproductive failure in swine. Experimental infection of Mammalian orthoreovirus Type 1 resulted in pneumonia, enteritis, fever, and diarrhea.
