= FDV =

FDV may refer to:

- Federation of the Greens (Italian: Federazione dei Verdi), a political party in Italy
- Festival du Voyageur, a winter festival in Winnipeg, Manitoba, Canada
- Fiji disease virus
- Fill and drain valve, a valve used in space and missile industry which achieves extremely tight leakage, while providing redundant inhibits against external leakage
- Flow divider valve, a valve providing a plurality of output flows from a single fluid source
