= Rice ragged stunt virus =

Virus classification
- (unranked): Virus
- Realm: Riboviria
- Kingdom: Orthornavirae
- Phylum: Duplornaviricota
- Class: Resentoviricetes
- Order: Reovirales
- Family: Spinareoviridae
- Genus: Oryzavirus
- Species: Oryzavirus oryzae

Synonyms
- Rice infectious gall virus

Species of virus

Rice ragged stunt virus (RRSV) is a plant pathogenic virus of the family Spinareoviridae.

RRSV, vectored by the brown planthopper (BPH) (Delphacidae: Nilaparvata lugens), causes ragged stunt disease of rice (Oryza spp., especially Oryza sativa). The virus, first described by Hibino, Ling and Shikata, is also less commonly known as rice infectious gall virus. RRSV has polyhedral particles about 50 nm in diameter possessing spikes (and perhaps a complete outer shell) to a diameter of 65 nm. The particles contain double-stranded RNA in ten segments. RRSV can only infect plants in the family Poaceae, i.e. grasses including rice. The virus can only be transmitted by BPH and is not mechanically transmitted to plants.

Rice plants infected with RRSV are stunted with whitish spindle-shaped outgrowths. Later the infected leaves become twisted with ragged edges, and may eventually turn brown. Rice plants may survive the infection, but yields are greatly reduced due to delayed flowering, incomplete panicle emergence, and unfilled grains. Symptoms of RRSV infection vary with the variety of rice and stage of growth. Most rice varieties of Oryza sativa japonica and Oryza sativa indica are susceptible to RRSV though several resistant varieties are available. Attempts to prevent RRSV infections by controlling BPH with insecticides often have the opposite effect of facilitating RRSV outbreaks; this can be due to a disproportionate effect of insecticides on the natural enemies of BPH. Certain types of insecticides (e.g., triazophos) increase the birthrates of BPH through their effects on the reproductive systems of male and female planthoppers. The increase in BPH populations not only increases the incidence of RRSV within a field, but as the BPH become crowded they transform into long-winged migratory forms (known as macropterous forms) and spread RRSV to fields up to hundreds of kilometers away.

During an outbreak it is difficult to distinguish RRSV yield losses from losses caused by BPH feeding. BPH also vectors rice grassy stunt virus (RGSV). It is often not possible to quantify how much of the crop loss was due to RRSV, RGSV, or BPH feeding damage. Field trials in Indonesia indicate that with a rice ragged stunt incidence of 34–76%, grain yields are only 17–47% of healthy plant yields. RRSV has been reported from China, India, Indonesia, Japan, Malaysia, the Philippines, Sri Lanka, Taiwan, Thailand, and Vietnam. Presence of RRSV is suspected, but not confirmed, in Cambodia, Lao PDR (Laos), and Myanmar (Burma). There were major outbreaks of RRSV and RGSV in China and Vietnam in 2006–2007.
