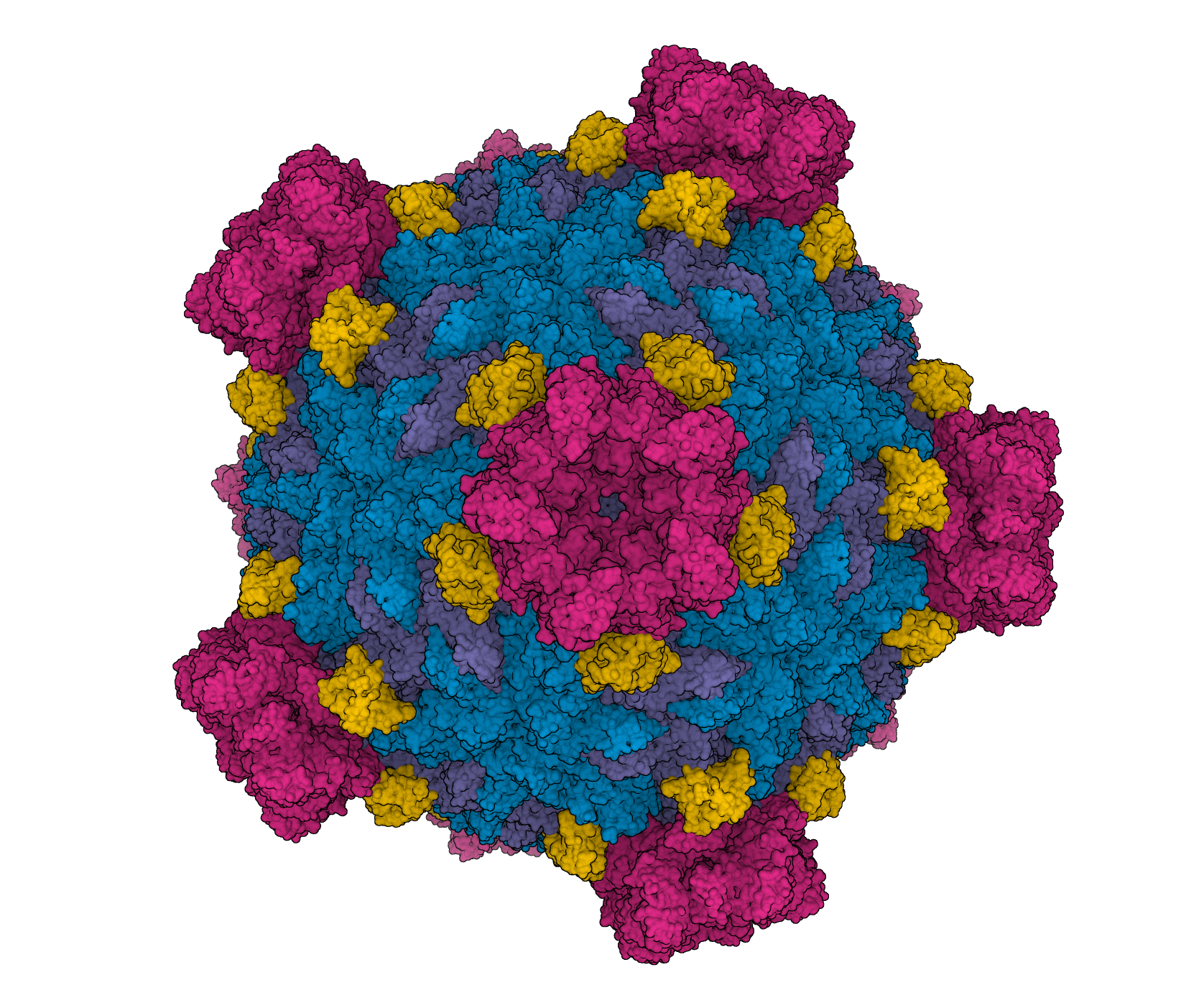
- Cryo-EM reconstruction of Fako virus capsid showing: turret protein (red), clamp protein (yellow), and homodimer of major capsid protein (blue/purple)

Virus classification
- (unranked): Virus
- Realm: Riboviria
- Kingdom: Orthornavirae
- Phylum: Duplornaviricota
- Class: Resentoviricetes
- Order: Reovirales
- Family: Spinareoviridae
- Genus: Dinovernavirus

= Dinovernavirus =

Genus of viruses

Dinovernavirus is a genus of double-stranded RNA viruses in the order Reovirales and family Spinareoviridae. Member viruses replicate in a variety of mosquito cell lines. The name is an abbreviation for double-stranded, insect, novem (Latin for nine the number of genome segments), rna virus. The genus contains two species.

== Classification ==
The genus has the following species, listed by scientific name and followed by the exemplar virus of the species:

- Dinovernavirus aedis, Aedes pseudoscutellaris reovirus
- Dinovernavirus albopictus, Aedes albopictus reovirus

== Structure ==
Viruses in Dinovernavirus are non-enveloped. Their capsid is turreted and single shelled with icosahedral geometries and T=2 symmetry. The diameter is around 49–50 nm.

== Genome ==
Genomes are linear and segmented. There are nine segments which code for nine proteins.

== Life cycle ==
Viral replication is cytoplasmic. Entry into the host cell is achieved by attachment to host receptors, which mediates endocytosis. Replication follows the double-stranded RNA virus replication model. Double-stranded RNA virus transcription is the method of transcription. The virus exits the host cell by monopartite non-tubule guided viral movement. Mosquito serve as the natural host.
