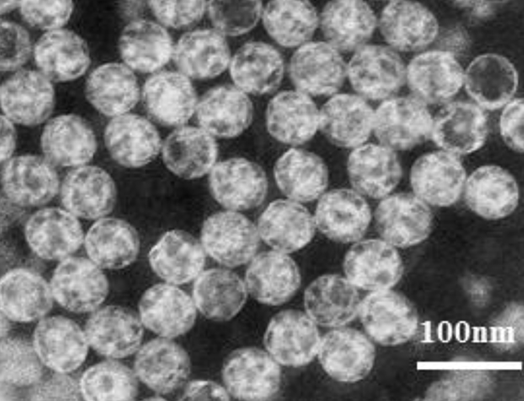
- TEM of SsMYRV4 particles

Virus classification
- (unranked): Virus
- Realm: Riboviria
- Kingdom: Orthornavirae
- Phylum: Duplornaviricota
- Class: Resentoviricetes
- Order: Reovirales
- Family: Spinareoviridae
- Genus: Mycoreovirus

= Mycoreovirus =

Genus of viruses

Mycoreovirus is a genus of double-stranded RNA viruses in the order Reovirales and family Spinareoviridae. Fungi serve as natural hosts. Diseases associated with this genus include: hypovirulence of the fungal host. The name of the group derives from Ancient Greek myco which means fungus. There are three species in this genus.

== Structure ==
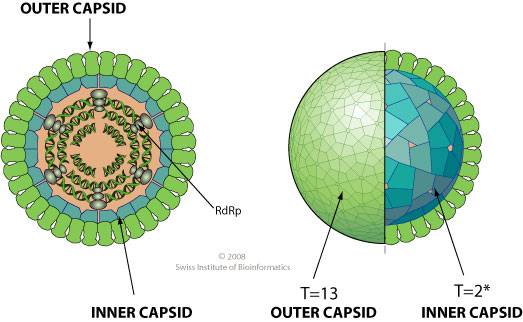
Mycoreovirus virion

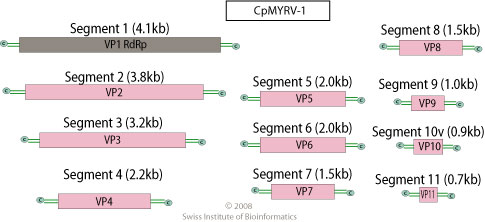
Genome map of Cryphonectria parasitica mycoreovirus-1, species Mycoreovirus 1

Viruses in genus Mycoreovirus are non-enveloped with icosahedral geometries. The outer capsid has T=13 symmetry and the inner capsid has T=2 symmetry. The diameter is around 80 nm. Genomes are linear and segmented, and around 23 kbp in total length. The genome codes for 12 proteins.

== Life cycle ==
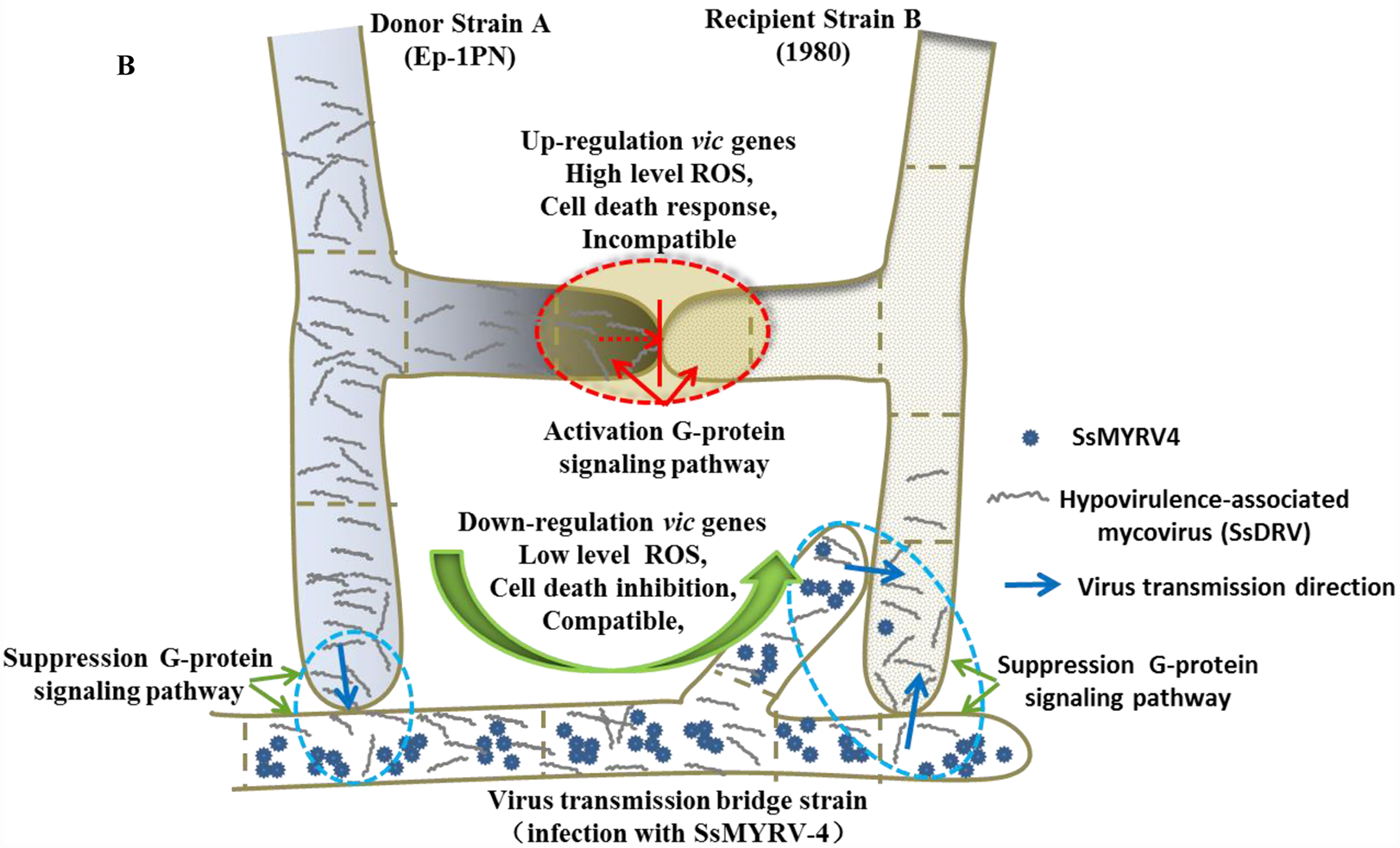
A model forSsMYRV4-mediated horizontal transmission

Viral replication is cytoplasmic. Entry into the host cell is achieved by attachment to host receptors, which mediates endocytosis. Replication follows the double-stranded RNA virus replication model. Double-stranded RNA virus transcription is the method of transcription. The virus exits the host cell by cell to cell movement, and monopartite non-tubule guided viral movement. Fungi serve as the natural host.

Genus	Host details	Tissue tropism	Entry details	Release details	Replication site	Assembly site	Transmission
Mycoreovirus	Fungi	Mycelium	Cell death; cytoplasmic exchange, sporogenesis; hyphal anastomosis	Cell death; cytoplasmic exchange, sporogenesis; hyphal anastomosis	Cytoplasm	Cytoplasm	Cytoplasmic exchange, sporogenesis; hyphal anastomosis

== Taxonomy ==
There are three species in this genus:

- Mycoreovirus alcryphonectriae
- Mycoreovirus becryphonectriae
- Mycoreovirus roselliniae
