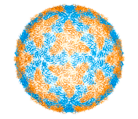
- Cryo-EM protein capsid structure of grass carp reovirus (GCRV)

Virus classification
- (unranked): Virus
- Realm: Riboviria
- Kingdom: Orthornavirae
- Phylum: Duplornaviricota
- Class: Resentoviricetes
- Order: Reovirales
- Family: Spinareoviridae
- Genus: Aquareovirus
- Species: Aquareovirus ctenopharyngodontis
- Virus: Golden shiner virus

= Golden shiner virus =

Species of virus

The golden shiner virus is an aquatic virus that infects a bait fish known as the golden shiner and to a lesser extent, aquatic animals like crustaceans and molluscs. It causes death through a hemorrhagic shock. Symptoms include bleeding from the back eyes and the head. The virus is 70 nm in diameter and replicates best at 20-30 degrees Celsius. The virus has properties similar to those of the pancreatic necrosis virus. This could mean that golden shiners are more susceptible in the summer.

== Virus genome ==
The genome is packed into the virus core and is encased in a double layered icosahedral capsid that is similar to the orthoreovirus capsid. This genome has 11 segments like the rotaviruses. Each genome has a 5' end motif of (GUUAUU) and (UUCAUC) motif at the 3' end. There are 11 open reading frames. Segments 1-3 encode viral proteins (VP)1-3, segments 4,7,8,9 and 11 code for non-structural proteins, segments 6 and 10 are for coding outer-capsid proteins. Lastly, segment 5 encodes an enzyme protein NTPase.
