= Idnoreovirus =

Virus classification
- (unranked): Virus
- Realm: Riboviria
- Kingdom: Orthornavirae
- Phylum: Duplornaviricota
- Class: Resentoviricetes
- Order: Reovirales
- Family: Spinareoviridae
- Genus: Idnoreovirus

Genus of viruses

Idnoreovirus is a genus of double-stranded RNA viruses in the order Reovirales and family Spinareoviridae. Hymenoptera insects serve as natural hosts. The genus name is an acronym for insect derived non occluded reovirus. There are five species in this genus.

== Structure ==
Viruses in genus Idnoreovirus are non-enveloped, with icosahedral geometries. The outer capsid has T=13 symmetry and the inner capsid has T=2 symmetry. The diameter is around 70 nm. Genomes are linear and segmented. They are around 27–30 kbp in total length. The genome codes for 11 proteins.

== Life cycle ==
Viral replication is cytoplasmic. Entry into the host cell is achieved by attachment to host receptors, which mediates endocytosis. Replication follows the double-stranded RNA virus replication model. Double-stranded RNA virus transcription is the method of transcription. The virus exits the host cell by monopartite non-tubule guided viral movement. Hymonoptera insects serve as the natural host.

== Taxonomy ==
The genus contains the following species:

- Idnoreovirus ceratitidis
- Idnoreovirus daci
- Idnoreovirus diadromi
- Idnoreovirus hypersoteris
- Idnoreovirus muscae
