= Barley yellow striate mosaic virus =

Virus classification
- (unranked): Virus
- Realm: Riboviria
- Kingdom: Orthornavirae
- Phylum: Negarnaviricota
- Class: Monjiviricetes
- Order: Mononegavirales
- Family: Rhabdoviridae
- Genus: Betacytorhabdovirus
- Species: Betacytorhabdovirus hordei

Synonyms
- Barley yellow striate mosaic cytorhabdovirus; Cereal striate mosaic virus; Cytorhabdovirus hordei

Species of virus

Barley yellow striate mosaic virus (BYSMV) is a plant virus of the family Rhabdoviridae. It is transmitted by the small brown planthopper, first reported in Laodelphax striatellus from Italy. Once transmitted, the symptoms in wheat species can include mosaics, chlorotic striations, stunting and head sterility.

The BYSMV genome consists of 12,706 nucleotides. The major structural proteins share identities with northern cereal mosaic virus (NCMV), making them closely related viruses. One of the key differences is BYSMV having a wider host range that includes Zea mays, Oryza sativa, Bromus inermis, Dactylis glomerata, and Poa pratensis which are not infected by NCMV.
