= Oryzavirus =

Virus classification
- (unranked): Virus
- Realm: Riboviria
- Kingdom: Orthornavirae
- Phylum: Duplornaviricota
- Class: Resentoviricetes
- Order: Reovirales
- Family: Spinareoviridae
- Genus: Oryzavirus

Genus of viruses

Oryzavirus is a genus of double-stranded RNA viruses in the order Reovirales and family Spinareoviridae. Member viruses infect plants and are transmitted by planthoppers. Diseases associated with this genus include: rice stunting, enations on veins of leaves and leaf sheaths, ragged leaves, and flower suppression. There are two species in this genus.

== Structure ==
Viruses in Oryzavirus are non-enveloped, with icosahedral and Round geometries, and T=13, T=2 symmetry. The diameter is around 70 nm. Genomes are linear and segmented, segments are around 1162 to 3849 base pairs (total size around 26 kb). The genome codes for 12 proteins.

== Life cycle ==
Viral replication is cytoplasmic. Entry into the host cell is achieved by penetration into the host cell. Replication follows the double-stranded RNA virus replication model. Double-stranded RNA virus transcription is the method of transcription. The virus exits the host cell by monopartite non-tubule guided viral movement. The virus is transmitted via a vector (delphacid planthoppers). Transmission routes are vector.

== Taxonomy ==
The genus contains the following species:

- Oryzavirus echinochloae, Echinochloa ragged stunt virus
- Oryzavirus oryzae, Rice ragged stunt virus
