= Viral arthritis (poultry) =

Infectious disease of poultry

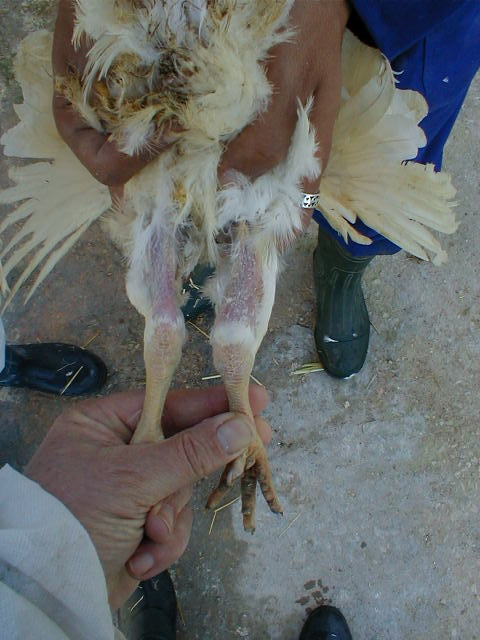
Right hock enlargement in viral arthritis in a parent-stock pullet

Viral arthritis is an infectious disease in poultry, such as chickens and turkeys, caused by Avian reovirus. Arthritis and tenosynovitis are the main signs of Avian reovirus infection in chickens, although the virus can cause other signs.

The prominent sign is swelling of the digital flexor and metatarsal extensor tendons. The hock joint itself is not so sharply affected, showing just a small amount of synovial exsudate when opened.

Vaccination is the primary method used to control this disease.
