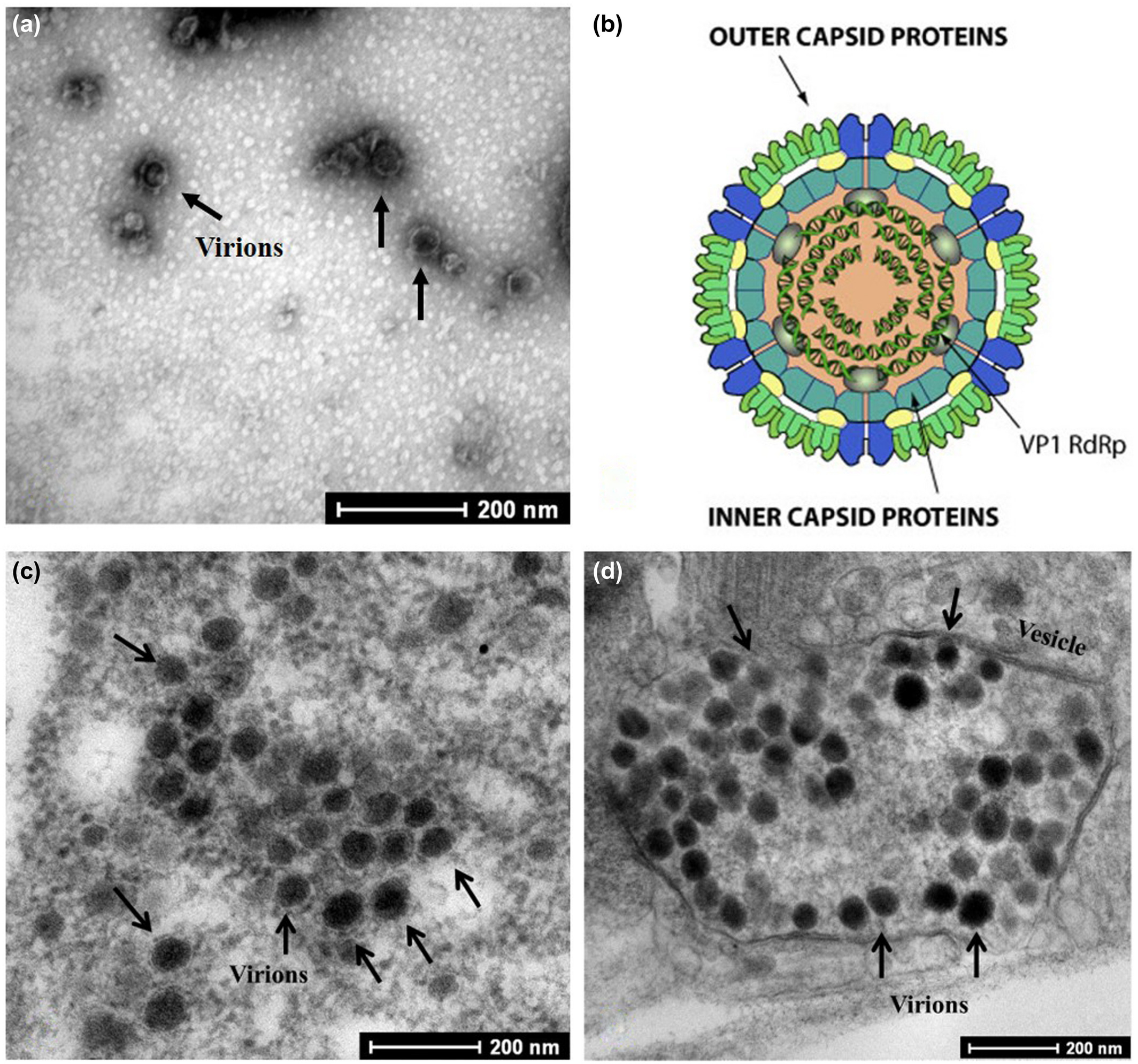
- Rice black streaked dwarf virus

Virus classification
- (unranked): Virus
- Realm: Riboviria
- Kingdom: Orthornavirae
- Phylum: Duplornaviricota
- Class: Resentoviricetes
- Order: Reovirales
- Family: Spinareoviridae
- Genus: Fijivirus

= Fijivirus =

Genus of viruses

Fijivirus is a genus of double-stranded RNA viruses in the order Reovirales and family Spinareoviridae. Plants serve as natural hosts. Diseases associated with this genus include: galls (tumours) in infected plants and Fiji disease, with severe stunting, deformation and death. The group name derives from Fiji island the place where the first virus was isolated. There are nine species in this genus.

== Structure ==
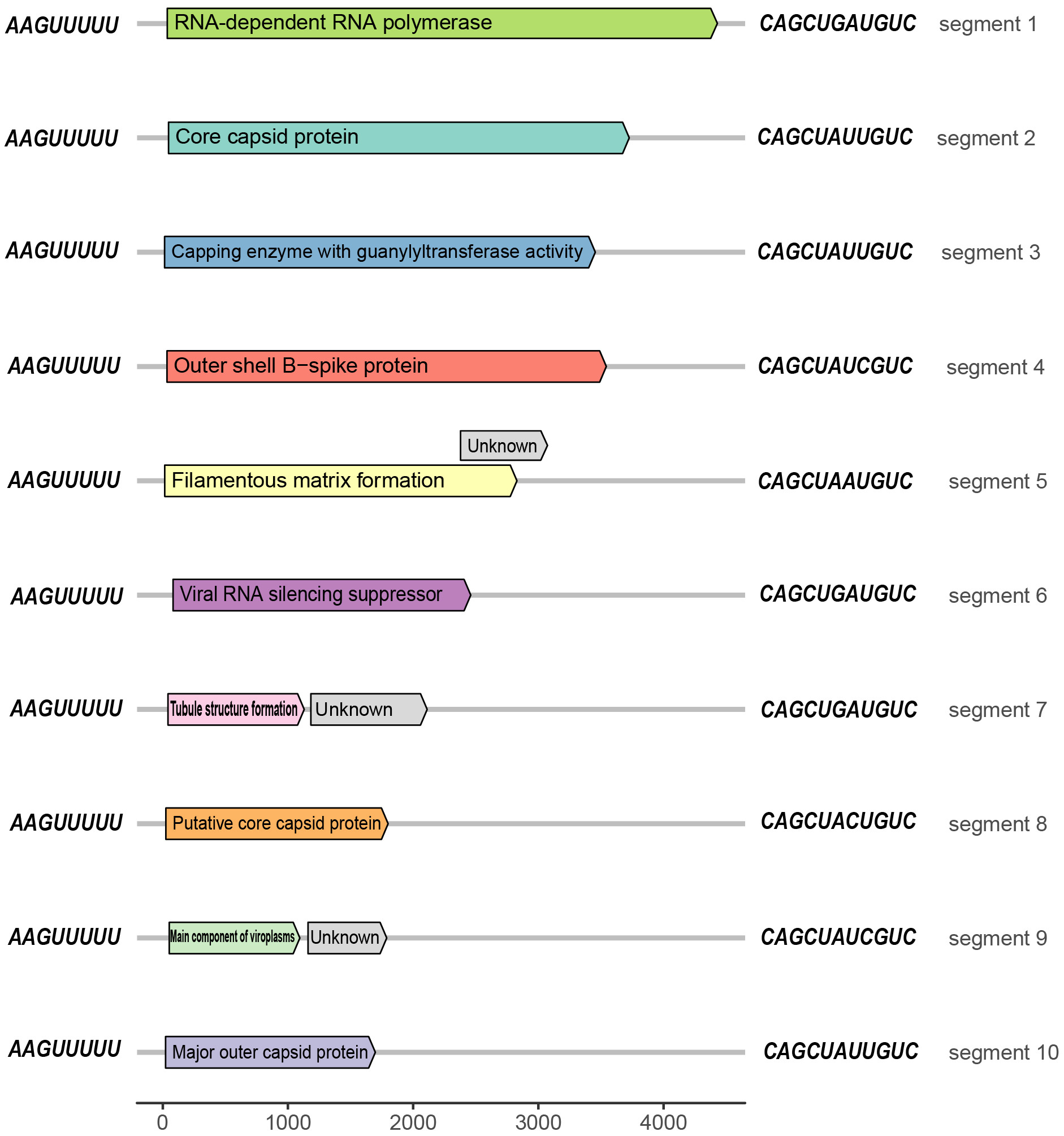
Rice black‐streaked dwarf virus genomic RNA segments

Fijivirus genome composition contains ten linear double-stranded RNA (dsRNA) and is carried within virus particles referred to as virions. The Fijivirus genome is constructed inside the virion and is non-enveloped. It contains two separate layers of capsids, an inner and an outer layer, which are constructed by proteins that shell the virus. The capsids are of icosahedral symmetry (T=2 for inner capsid, T=13 for outer capsid), and have an obvious round structure, which is on average 65–70 nm in diameter. Genomes are linear and segmented, around 4.5 kbp in length. The genome codes for 12 proteins.

== Replication ==
Replications of the Fijivirus occurs within the cytoplasm; the virus will diffuse through the cytoplasm of the cell. Transcription of the dsRNA genome occurs inside the virion, and this is important so that the dsRNA is not exposed to the cytoplasm. Transcription results in a positive strand that is then used as the template for translation. The positive RNAs become enclosed within the virion, and then are transcribed to give RNA molecules. With the newly formed molecule, it then becomes base-paired to produce the dsRNA genomes as described above. Mature virions are released following cell death and the breakdown of the affected hosts plasma membrane.

== Transmission ==
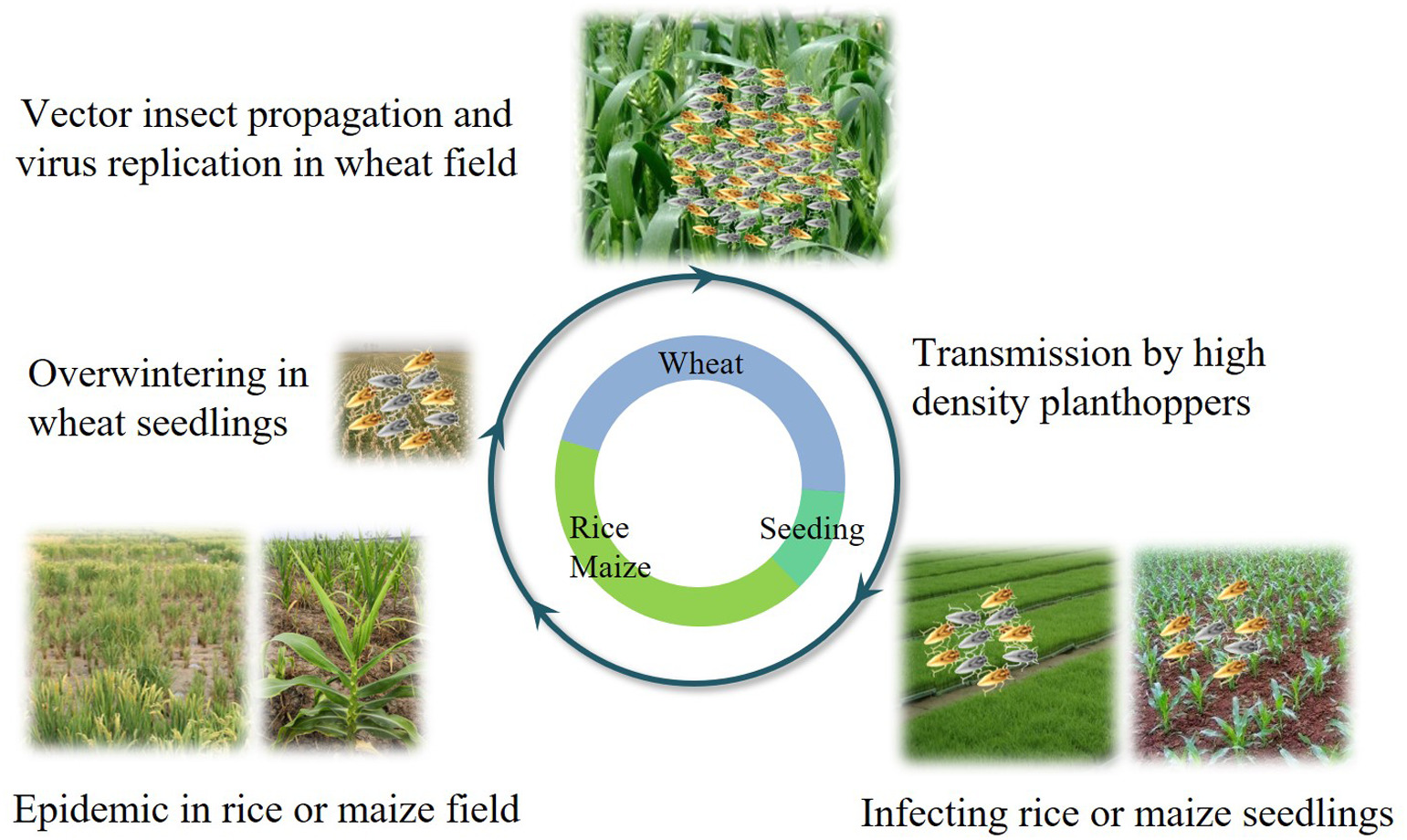
The infection cycle of rice black‐streaked dwarf virus (RBSDV) induced diseases on rice, maize, and wheat

The virus is transmitted by planthoppers, which are insects, or other types of organisms. The virus will infect the phloem tissues of its plant (Gramineae and Liliacea) hosts. If the presence of a gall appears, usually located on specific parts of the plant, it can represent the first sign of the virus (Pearson 2004). Replication can occur both in the host and the vector. The plant is unable to recover from the unexpected growth and therefore can become stunted, and can eventually die.

== Taxonomy ==
The genus contains the following species:

- Fijivirus allii, Garlic dwarf virus
- Fijivirus alporyzae, Rice black-streaked dwarf virus
- Fijivirus avenae, Oat sterile dwarf virus
- Fijivirus boryzae, Southern rice black-streaked dwarf virus
- Fijivirus cuartoense, Mal de Rio Cuarto virus
- Fijivirus digitariae, Pangola stunt virus
- Fijivirus fijiense, Fiji disease virus
- Fijivirus nilaparvatae, Nilaparvata lugens reovirus
- Fijivirus zeae, Maize rough dwarf virus
