= Fiji disease virus =

Virus classification
- (unranked): Virus
- Realm: Riboviria
- Kingdom: Orthornavirae
- Phylum: Duplornaviricota
- Class: Resentoviricetes
- Order: Reovirales
- Family: Spinareoviridae
- Genus: Fijivirus
- Species: Fijivirus fijiense

Species of virus

Fiji disease virus (FDV) is a plant virus of the family Spinareoviridae.

Fiji disease virus is named after the country in which it was originally observed. The earliest recording of FDV is from 1886 in a commercial farming spread of infection. By 1906, FDV had spread throughout the islands in the Pacific Ocean, posing a major threat to the sugar industry in the region. A major outbreak occurred in the 1950s when two varieties of sugar cane were planted that presented a high susceptibility to the virus. Although it was not discovered in New Guinea until 1914, it is considered to be the original location of FDV. FDV was most likely present in much of the Oceania region including Australia and the Philippines before its discovery in 1886.

== Structure ==
The virus is between 65 and 70 nm in diameter. FDV is not enveloped but has a nucleocapsid. The capsid has two layers and is icosahedral. The two known cell surface proteins are A type and B type spikes. The capsid appears round.

== Genome ==
As FDV is a reovirus its genome is also made of dsRNA. The genome is linear and made up of ten segments, consisting of 27000-30500 base pairs. There are at least six structural proteins coded for in the genome. Replication occurs in the host cell cytoplasm or cytoplasmic viroplasma.

== Transmission ==
The virus is transmitted by Delphacidae plant hoppers. The disease is mostly found in Australia because this is the natural habitat of the plant hoppers. It has also been detected in the Philippines. The virus infects the phloem tissues of their Gramineae hosts. Replication can occur in both the host and vector. The result of infection in plants is the development of tumours.

The appearance of galls, which are an unusual symptom of a virus, is an early sign of infection. They can appear on the underside of the leaf or in larger veins. The size and shape of the galls vary depending on their location. The appearance of the galls is also a characteristic of the Fiji sugarcane disease, which is different from other types of sugarcane disease. The infected leaves are usually dark green and have irregular margins, and the top portion of the plant has a fan-like appearance. Adult planthoppers have wings, which allow them to fly away from a diseased plant. The Perkinsiella virus can be spread by any stage of the development of the organism. Once the insects are fed with the virus, it can then multiply inside them and infect healthy sugarcane. The disease can often also be spread by planting material such as plants that farms believe are uninfect can be chosen for planting which further spreads the virus among crops.[1]

The FAO and the ITRI have developed a set of technical guidelines that help countries when it comes to the movement of sugarcane germplasm. These guidelines specify the procedures that should be followed when transferring seeds and materials. In vitro culture is commonly used for this procedure [3]. Specific protocols to remove FDV can be but are not limited to: heat treatment, quarantines, and tissue culture of axillary buds. These protocols are in needing of refinement as they have proved to be only 28% effective. [2]

Important control factors in Australia and Fiji such as proper inspection and isolation or termination of diseased plants has been shown to be the most effective in regions where the presence of FDV is in moderate amounts. Legal action has been passed in Australia to mandate the ploughing of diseased plants. Lastly, in Australia, plants sown in August or September have demonstrated lower rates of the disease, due to the presence of lower numbers of leaf hoppers in the August and September months, leading to less spread of FDV. [2]
