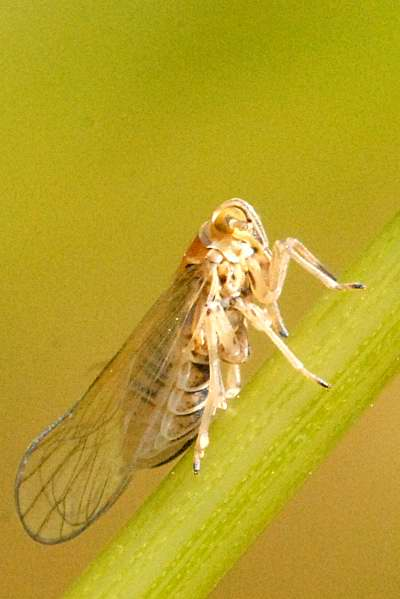

Scientific classification
- Kingdom: Animalia
- Phylum: Arthropoda
- Clade: Pancrustacea
- Class: Insecta
- Order: Hemiptera
- Suborder: Auchenorrhyncha
- Infraorder: Fulgoromorpha
- Family: Delphacidae
- Genus: Laodelphax
- Species: L. striatellus

Binomial name
- Laodelphax striatellus (Fallén, 1826)

= Laodelphax striatellus =

Species of true bug

Laodelphax striatellus, the small brown planthopper, is a species of true bug belonging to the family Delphacidae.

It is native to Eurasia and Northern Africa. It is known to transmit the rice black-streaked dwarf virus and barley yellow striate mosaic virus.
