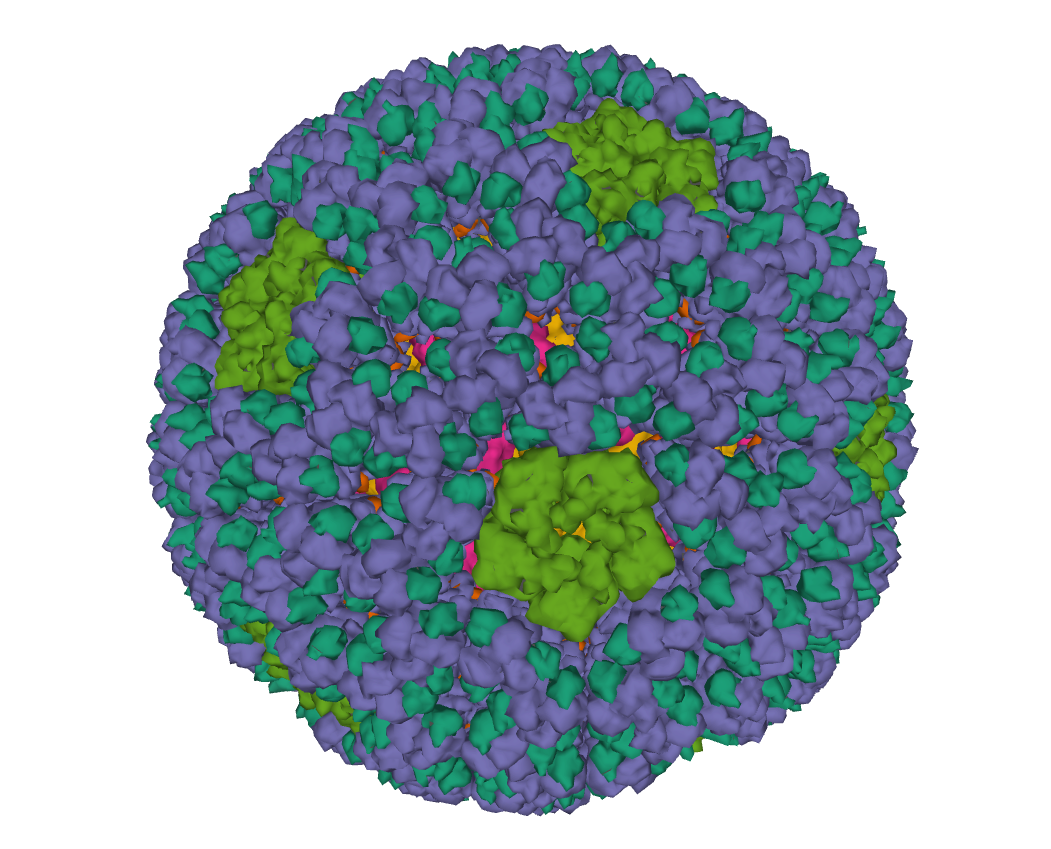
- Cryo-EM protein capsid structure of Grass carp reovirus (GCRV)
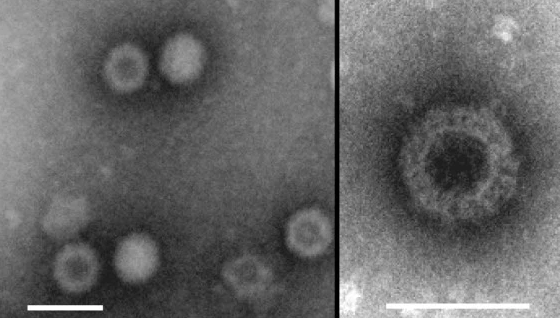
- EM of Scophthalmus maximus reovirus (SMReV) virion bars equal 100 nm.

Virus classification
- (unranked): Virus
- Realm: Riboviria
- Kingdom: Orthornavirae
- Phylum: Duplornaviricota
- Class: Resentoviricetes
- Order: Reovirales
- Family: Spinareoviridae
- Genus: Aquareovirus

= Aquareovirus =

Genus of viruses

Aquareovirus is a genus of double-stranded RNA viruses in the order Reovirales and family Spinareoviridae. Fish, shellfish, and crustacean species serve as natural hosts. Aquareoviruses in general have low or no pathogenicity for fish. However, some cause hemorrhagic disease, hepatitis and pancreatitis. Grass carp hemorrhage virus (causes hemorrhagic disease of grass carp) is the most pathogenic aquareovirus. There are seven species in this genus.

== Structure ==
Aquareoviruses are non-enveloped, with a double capsid structure that has icosahedral geometries, and T=13, T=2 symmetry. The diameter is around 75 nm.

== Genome ==
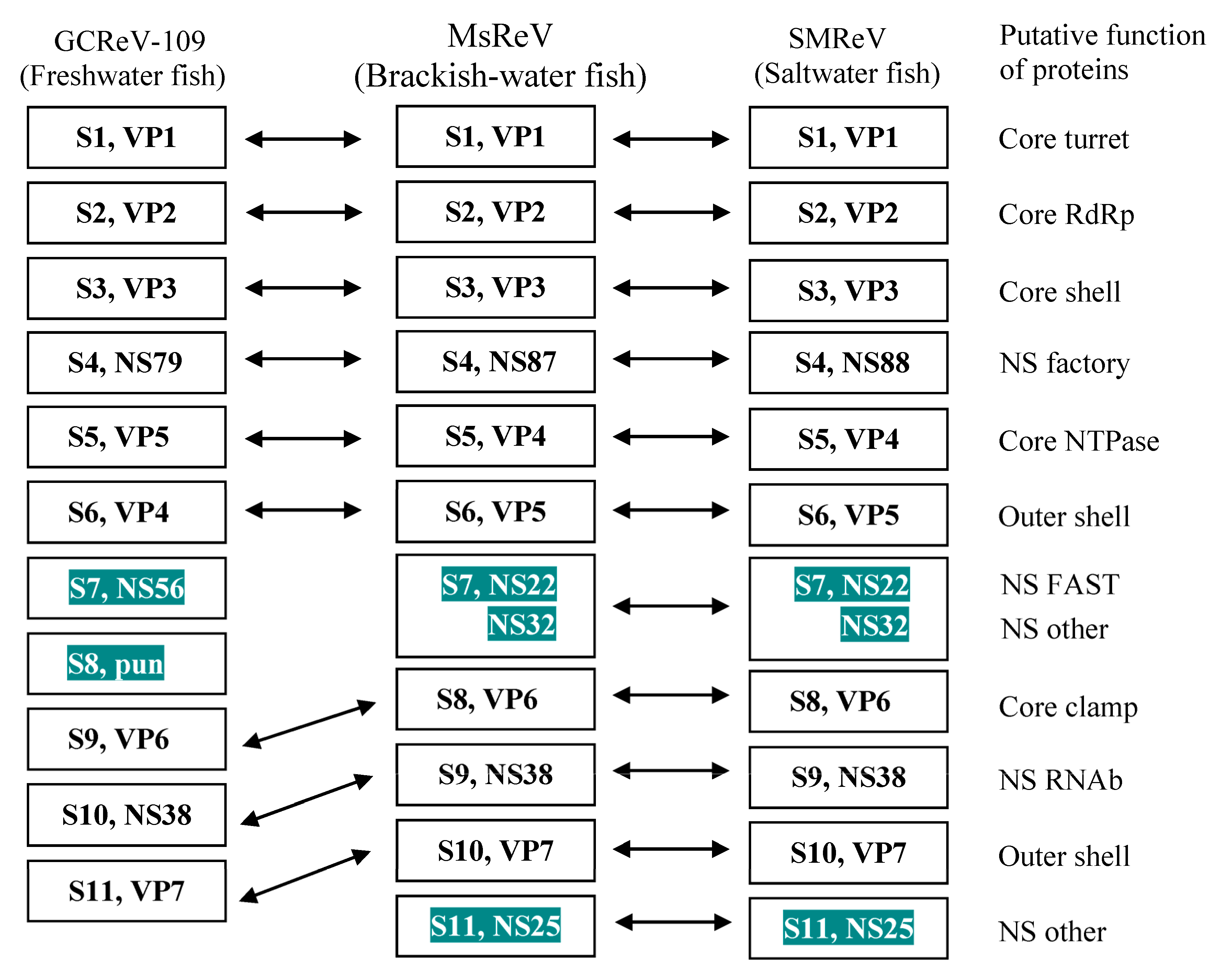
Comparison of genomes of different members of the genus Aquareovirus

Aquareoviruses have double-stranded RNA genomes which are linear and segmented. The total genome length ranges from 18.2 to 30.5 kbp. The genome has eleven segments and codes for twelve proteins.

== Life cycle ==
Viral replication is cytoplasmic. Entry into the host cell is achieved by attachment to host cell receptors, which mediates endocytosis. Replication follows the double-stranded RNA virus replication model. Double-stranded RNA virus transcription is the method of transcription. The virus exits the host cell by monopartite non-tubule guided viral movement. Fish, shellfish, and crustacean species serve as the natural host.

== Taxonomy ==
The genus Aquareovirus has seven member species:

- Aquareovirus ctenopharyngodontis, which includes Golden shiner virus and Grass carp virus
- Aquareovirus graminis
- Aquareovirus ictaluri
- Aquareovirus maculosi
- Aquareovirus oncorhynchi
- Aquareovirus salmonis
- Aquareovirus scophthalmi
