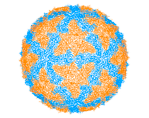
- Cryo-EM of the protein structure of an orthoreovirus capsid

Virus classification
- (unranked): Virus
- Realm: Riboviria
- Kingdom: Orthornavirae
- Phylum: Duplornaviricota
- Class: Resentoviricetes
- Order: Reovirales
- Family: Spinareoviridae
- Genus: Orthoreovirus

Species
- Avian orthoreovirus; Baboon orthoreovirus; Broome orthoreovirus; Mahlapitsi orthoreovirus; Mammalian orthoreovirus; Nelson Bay orthoreovirus; Neoavian orthoreovirus; Piscine orthoreovirus; Reptilian orthoreovirus; Testudine orthoreovirus

= Orthoreovirus =

Genus of viruses

Orthoreovirus is a genus of viruses, in the family Reoviridae, in the subfamily Spinareovirinae. Vertebrates serve as natural hosts. There are ten species in this genus. Diseases associated with this genus include mild upper respiratory tract disease, gastroenteritis, and biliary atresia. Mammalian orthoreovirus 3 (strain dearing-T3D) induces cell death preferentially in transformed cells and therefore displays inherent oncolytic properties.

== History ==
The name "orthoreovirus" comes from the Greek word ortho, meaning "straight" and the reovirus, which comes from taking the letters: R, E, and O from "respiratory enteric orphan virus". The Orthoreovirus was named an orphan virus because it was not known to be associated with any known disease. It was discovered in the early 1950s when it was isolated from the respiratory as well as gastrointestinal tracts of both sick and healthy individuals

== Classification ==
Orthoreovirus is part of the family Reoviridae. Its genome is composed of segmented double-stranded RNA (dsRNA), thus it is classified as a group III virus according to the Baltimore classification system of viruses. This family of viruses is taxonomically classified into 15 distinct genera. These genera are sorted out taking into account the number of dsRNA genomes. The Orthoreovirus genus has 10 segments that have been isolated from a large range of hosts including mammals, birds, and reptiles. These genera are further divided into two phenotypic groups: fusogenic and non-fusogenic. The way that they are determined to belong to a specific group is if the virus is able to cause multinucleated cells known as syncytial cells. According to this classification, mammalian orthoreoviruses (MRV) are known to be non-fusogenic, meaning it does not produce syncytia, while other members of this genus are fusogenic, such as avian orthoreoviruses (ARV), baboon orthoreoviruses (BRV), reptilian orhtoreoviruses (RRV).

=== Taxonomy ===
The following ten species are assigned to the genus:

- Avian orthoreovirus
- Baboon orthoreovirus
- Broome orthoreovirus
- Mahlapitsi orthoreovirus
- Mammalian orthoreovirus
- Nelson Bay orthoreovirus
- Neoavian orthoreovirus
- Piscine orthoreovirus
- Reptilian orthoreovirus
- Testudine orthoreovirus

== Structure ==
Mammalian orthoreovirus virions are non-enveloped with icosahedral symmetry created by a double-layered capsid reaching about 80 nm wide. Each capsid contains 10 segments of double stranded RNA (dsRNA) genome. The inner capsid or core particle (T=2) contains five different proteins: σ2, λ1, λ2, λ3, and μ2 and is approximately 70 nm in diameter. One hundred and twenty copies of the λ1 protein arranged in 12 decameric units make up the shell of the inner capsid structure. This shell is stabilized by one hundred and fifty copies of the σ2 protein that 'clamp' adjacent λ1 monomers together. At the 12 five-fold axes of symmetry, pentamers of the λ2 protein form turret-like structures that protrudes from the surface of the shell. In the center of the λ2 turret a channel allows viral mRNAs to be extruded during transcription. The channel is 70Å at its base and 15Å at its narrowest point. The core also contains within it twelve copies of λ3, the RNA-dependent RNA polymerase. One λ3 protein is found slightly offset from each of the twelve pentameric λ2 turrets. Closely associated with λ3 are one or two copies of μ2, a transcriptase cofactor. μ2 has been found to have some enzymatic functions, such as NTPase activity. The λ3 protein is responsible for transcription of the double-stranded RNA genome segments. Each transcript is threaded through the λ2 pentameric turret as it is being extruded. Guanylyltransferase enzymatic activity in the λ2 turret adds a 5' guanosine cap to the extruded mRNA. In addition, two methyltransferase domains found in the λ2 structure act to methylate the 7N position of the added guanosine and the 2' O of the first templated nucleotide, which in all cases is also a guanosine. The outer capsid (T=13) is composed of μ1 and σ3 proteins with λ2, in compound with σ1, interspersed around the capsid. It has been proposed that λ2 is involved in replication due to its placement at the fivefold axes and its ability to interact with λ3 in solution. σ1, a filamentous trimer extruding from the outer capsid, is responsible for cell attachment by interacting with sialic acid and other entry receptors. μ1 and σ3 are both involved in the attachment and thus entry of the virus via receptor-mediated endocytosis involving the formation of clathrin-coated pits.

Genus	Structure	Symmetry	Capsid	Genomic arrangement	Genomic segmentation
Orthoreovirus	Icosahedral	T=13, T=2	Non-enveloped	Linear	Segmented

== Strains ==
- Mammalian orthoreoviruses

The only orthoreovirus to not produce syncytia, mammalian orthoreoviruses have the capability of infecting all mammals, but do not cause disease, except in young populations enabling them to be studied frequently as a model for viral replication and pathogenesis.

- Pteropine orthoreovirus

This orthoreovirus has been extracted from the heart blood of a fruit bat (Pteropus policephalus) in Australia with different viruses being isolated from different species, such as the flying fox (Pteropus hypomelanus) which have been found to cause respiratory infections in humans in Southeast Asia. The Nelson Bay Orthoreovirus, like the Avian orthoreovirus, has 3 open reading frames (ORFs) which encode for three different proteins: P10 which promotes syncytia formation, P17, and σC involved in cell attachment.

- Baboon orthoreovirus

The syncytia inducing capabilities of this class of orthoreoviruses combined with their association to encephalitis in baboons, distinguish them from other mammalian orthoreoviruses. While these viruses have the signature Orthoreovirus genome, they have not been found to encode for a cell attachment protein (σC), they do not encode any S-class genome segments, and are organized differently from the other species of fusogenic orthoreoviruses. The BRV genome contains 2 ORFs and contains two proteins, p15 and p16, that are not homologous to known viral or cellular proteins; however, p15 has been found to be the cell fusion protein in BRV.

- Avian orthoreovruses

The Avian orthoreovirus has a similar structure compared to the Mammalian Orthoreovirus with the differences mainly existing in the proteins that it encodes: 10 structural proteins and 4 non-structural proteins. However, these proteins have not been studied in depth, so there is some skepticism regarding their exact functions. The pathogenesis of this virus has been studied in an attempt to determine the pathway of inducing apoptosis. Avian orthoreovirus induces apoptosis by what has been proposed as an upregulation of p53 and Bax, a mitochondria-mediated pathway. P17 has also been found to play a role in growth retardation involved in the p53 pathway. Avian Orthoreoviruses have been found to cause diseases in poultry including chronic respiratory disease, malabsorption syndrome, and arthritis representing economic losses that make this virus particularly important to study.

- Reptilian orthoreovirus

These orthoreoviruses were first isolated in 1987 from a moribund python (Python regius) and was found to cause high levels of syncytium formation but did not cause hemagglutination in human red blood cells (RBCs). In reptiles the virus has been found widely but is not necessarily associated with any specific disease. The virus has been found to have 2 ORFs encoding for p14, a cell fusion protein and σC. RRVs belong to the fusogenic subgroup and has only recently been classified as a distinct subgroup of orthoreoviruses.

- Piscine orthoreovirus

Also known as Piscine reovirus or PRV, was initially discovered in Atlantic salmon and subsequently in Pacific salmon and is associated with Heart and Skeletal Muscle Inflammation (HSMI)

== Infection and transmission ==
Transmission of the virus is either through the fecal–oral route or through respiratory droplets. The virus is transmitted horizontally and only known to cause disease in vertebrates. Different levels of virulence may be observed depending on the strain of orthoreovirus. Species that are known to become infected with the virus include: humans, birds, cattle, monkeys, sheep, swine, baboons, and bats

== Replication ==
Replication occurs in the cytoplasm of the host cell. The following lists the replication cycle of the virus from attachment to egress of the new virus particle ready to infect next host cell.

- Attachment

Attachment occurs with the aid of the virus σ1 protein. This is a filamentous trimer protein that projects out of the outer capsid of the virus. There are two receptors for the virus on the host cell. There is the junctional adhesion molecule-A, which is a serotype-independent receptor as well as the sialic acid coreceptor. Viral proteins μ1 and σ3 are responsible for attachment by binding to the receptors. After the attachment to the receptors, entry to the host cell occurs via receptor-mediated endocytosis through the aid of clathrin coated pits.

- Uncoating and Entry

Once inside the host cell, the virus must find a way to uncoat. The virus particles enter the cell in a structure known as an endosome (also called an endolysosome). Disassembly is a stepwise process. Uncoating requires a low pH, which is provided by the help of endocytic proteases. Acidification of the endosome removes the outer-capsid protein σ3. This removal allows membrane-penetration mediator μ1 to be exposed and attachment protein σ1 goes through a conformational change. After uncoating is completed, the active virus is released in the cytoplasm where replication of the genome and virion takes place.

- Replication of genome and proteins

Replication of the virus takes places in the cytoplasm of the host cell. Since the genome of this virus is dsRNA, early transcription of the genome must take place inside the capsid where it is safe and will not be degraded by the host cell. dsRNA inside of a cell is a tip off to the immune system that the cell is infected with a virus, since dsRNA does not occur in the normal replication of a cell. As transcription occurs with the aid of viral polymerase, protein λ3 serves as the RNA-dependent RNA polymerase, full strands of positive sense single stranded RNA (mRNA) are synthesized from each of the dsRNA segments. Viral protein, μ2, is known to be a transcriptase cofactor during transcription. It has been determined that this protein has some enzymatic functions such as NTPase activity, capping the mRNA transcript, even serving as RNA helicase to separate the dsRNA strands. The viral helicase comes from protein λ3 These mRNA now are able to go into the cytoplasm to be translated into protein. The viral protein gyanyltransferase λ2 is responsible for capping the viral mRNA. Mammalian orthoreovirus mRNA transcripts have a short 5’ un translated region (UTR), do not have 3’ poly A tails, and may even lack 5’ caps during late post-infection. Thus is it not known how exactly how these uncapped versions of viral mRNA are able to use host cell ribosome to aid in translation. To be able to produce the genome, positive sense RNAs serve as the template strand to make negative sense RNA. The positive and negative strands will base-pair to create the dsRNA genome of the virus.

- Assembly and Maturation

The assembly of new virion occurs in sub-viral particles in the cytoplasm. Since this virus has two capsids, each capsid, T13 (outer capsid) and T2 (inner capsid) need to be able to self-assemble to form the virus particle. It is known that the assembly of T13 capsid is dependent on viral protein σ3. This allows the formation of heterohexameric complexes to be made. The T2 capsid proteins of orthoreovirus need the co-expression of both the T2 protein and the nodular σ2 protein to stabilize the structure and aid in assembly. Positive and negative strands of RNA produced during the transcription state must base pair correctly in order to serve as the genome in the newly formed virus particle.

- Release (Egress)

After virus has fully assembled and matured, the newly formed virus particle is released. It is unknown how they exit the host cell, but it thought that this is done once the host cell has died and disintegrated, allowing for easy exit of newly formed virus.

Genus	Host details	Tissue tropism	Entry details	Release details	Replication site	Assembly site	Transmission
Orthoreovirus	Vertebrates	Epithelium: intestinal; epithelium:bile duct; epithelium: lung; leukocytes; endothelium: CNS	Clathrin-mediated endocytosis	Cell death	Cytoplasm	Cytoplasm	Aerosol; oral-fecal

== Signs and symptoms ==
Mammalian orthoreovirus does not really cause a significant disease in humans. Even though the virus is fairly common, the infection produced is either asymptomatic or causes a mild disease which is self-limiting in the gastrointestinal tract and respiratory region for children and infants. Symptoms are similar to what a person might have when they have the common cold, such as a low-grade fever and pharyngitis. However, in other animals such as baboons and reptiles, other known orthoreoviruses fusogenic strains can cause more serious illness. In baboons it can cause neurological illness while in reptiles it can be the cause of pneumonia. In birds this virus may even cause death.

== Pathophysiology ==
Members of the Orthoreovirus genus have been known to cause apoptosis in host cells, and have thus been studied fairly extensively for this very purpose. Mammalian orthoreoviruses induce apoptosis via the activation of several death receptors—TNFR, TRAIL, and Fas—while avian orthoreovirus has been found to use the up-regulation of p53 to induce apoptosis. Both of these strains have also been found to be involved in G2/M cell cycle arrest. The avian orthoreovirus has also been proven to promote autophagy of the host which could contribute to disease in a similar manner as apoptosis. The inhibition of the innate immune response has also been seen in mammalian and avian orthoreoviruses. Other strains of the orthoreoviruses have not been studied as frequently as mammalian and avian strains resulting in a lack of understanding in the pathophysiology of those strains, though it can be assumed they act in similar ways.

== Oncolytic properties ==
One of the most relevant uses for the mammalian orthoreoviruses are the manipulation of their oncolytic properties for their use in cancer treatments. This particular use of reoviruses was discovered in 1995 by Dr Patrick Lee who discovered these viruses could kill those cells that contained an over-activated Ras pathway, often a hallmark of cancerous cells. These viruses are particularly ideal for these sorts of therapies because they are self-limiting while simultaneously harnessing the ability to induce apoptosis in tumor cells exclusively. One of the more widely used strains for these anti-cancer clinical trials is the serotype 3 dearing strain, Resolysin, used in phase I-III trials. A variety of cancers have been treated with this therapy, either alone or in tandem with others, including multiple myeloma, ovarian epithelial, and pancreatic cancers. A recent clinical trial demonstrated that mammalian orthoreovirus was effective in inducing apoptosis in hypoxic prostate tumor cells with hopes of success in clinical trials.

== Diagnosis ==
To be able to perform a proper diagnosis of this pathogen is it important to take samples from the suspected infected individuals such as a stool, throat, or nasopharyngeal sample. There are various tests that can be done on these samples to see if a person is infected. Viral antigen can be detected by performing an assay. A serological assay can also be performed on the sample to look for virus-specific antibodies present in the sample, thus showing that the person is trying to combat the virus. The virus can be isolated in culture through the use of mouse-L fibroblasts, green monkey kidney cells, as well as HeLa cells.

== See also ==
- Double-stranded RNA viruses
- Avian reovirus
