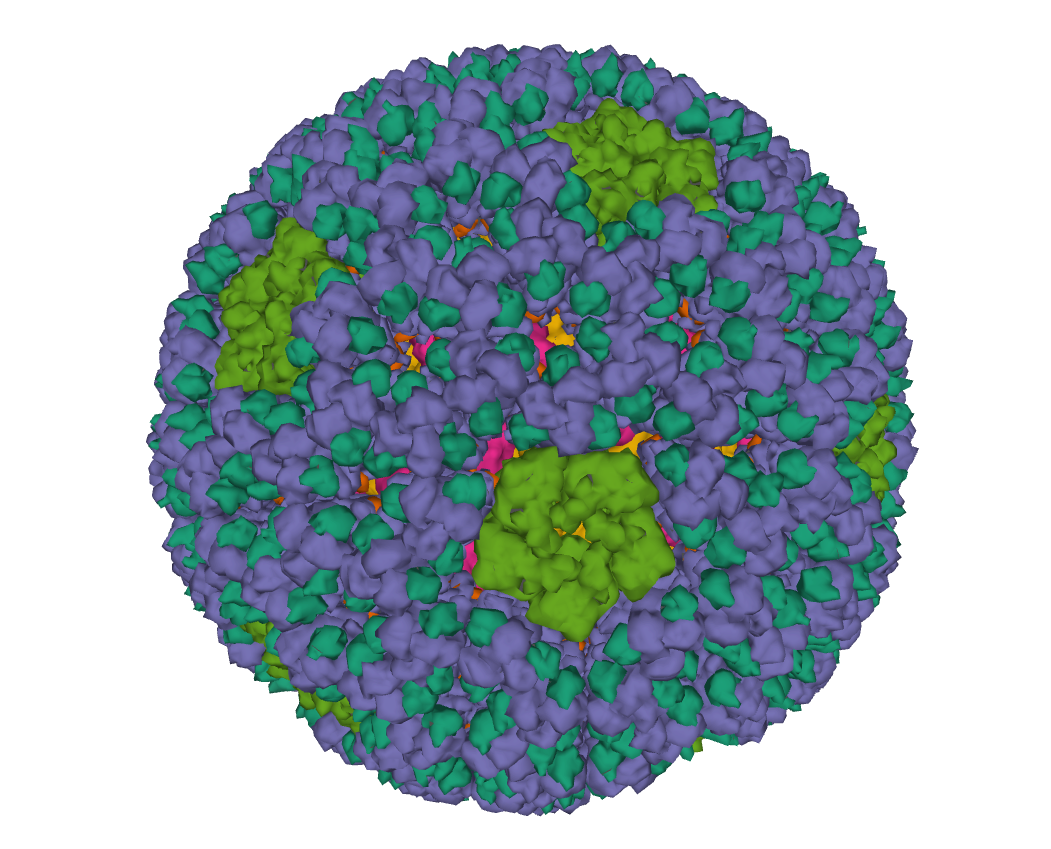
- Cryo-EM protein capsid structure of grass carp reovirus (GCRV)

Virus classification
- (unranked): Virus
- Realm: Riboviria
- Kingdom: Orthornavirae
- Phylum: Duplornaviricota
- Class: Resentoviricetes
- Order: Reovirales
- Family: Spinareoviridae

= Spinareoviridae =

Family of viruses

Spinareoviridae is a family of double-stranded RNA viruses in the order Reovirales. Viruses in this group are distinguished by the presence of a turreted protein on the inner capsid. (Spina = spiny or thorny in Latin.)

== Taxonomy ==
The family has nine genera:

- Aquareovirus
- Coltivirus
- Cypovirus
- Dinovernavirus
- Fijivirus
- Idnoreovirus
- Mycoreovirus
- Orthoreovirus
- Oryzavirus
