= Amalgaviridae =

Virus classification
- (unranked): Virus
- Realm: Riboviria
- Kingdom: Orthornavirae
- Phylum: Pisuviricota
- Class: Duplopiviricetes
- Order: Durnavirales
- Family: Amalgaviridae

Genera
- Amalgavirus; Zybavirus

Family of viruses

Amalgaviridae is a family of double-stranded RNA viruses. Member viruses infect plants and are transmitted vertically via seeds. The name derives from amalgam (blend, mix) which refers to amalgaviruses possessing characteristics of both partitiviruses and totiviruses. The family contains three genera.

== Genome ==
Amalgavirus genomes are monopartite and about 3.5 kilobases in length. They have two partially overlapping open reading frames which encode the RNA-dependent RNA polymerase (RdRp) and a putative capsid protein.

== Evolution ==
It has been suggested that amalgaviruses have evolved via recombination between viruses with double-stranded and negative-strand RNA genomes. Phylogenetic analysis indicates that the amalgavirus RdRp forms a sister clade to the corresponding RdRp protein of partitiviruses (Partitiviridae) which have segmented (bipartite) dsRNA genomes and infect plants, fungi and protists. By contrast, the putative capsid protein of amalgaviruses is homologous to the nucleocapsid proteins of negative-strand RNA viruses of the genera Phlebovirus and Tenuivirus.

== Taxonomy ==
The family contains the following genera:

- Amalgavirus
- Unirnavirus
- Zybavirus
