= Cryspovirus =

Cryspovirus cryptosporidii

Virus classification
- (unranked): Virus
- Realm: Riboviria
- Kingdom: Orthornavirae
- Phylum: Pisuviricota
- Class: Duplopiviricetes
- Order: Durnavirales
- Family: Partitiviridae
- Genus: Cryspovirus
- Species: Cryspovirus cryptosporidii

Genus of viruses

Cryspovirus is a genus of viruses, in the family Partitiviridae. Protists serve as natural hosts. There is only one species in this genus: Cryptosporidium parvum virus 1 (Cryspovirus cryptosporidii).

Cryptosporidium, a genus of Apicomplexan parasites, is known to cause human diarrheal illness. A bi-segmented dsRNA virus linked with Cryptosporidium was discovered and found to have similarities with picobirnaviruses and partitiviruses. This discovery led to the identification of a distinct virus called Cryptosporidium parvum virus 1 (CSpV1). It was suggested to be the sole partitivirus found in a protozoan host. Based on this, a new genus named Cryspovirus was proposed within the Partitiviridae family, which was subsequently approved by the ICTV Executive Committee in 2009. CSpV1, also known as Cryspovirus, is believed to be transmitted intracellularly through Cryptosporidium oocysts and is linked with persistent, mostly non-virulent infections. The virus features isometric virions and has a genome composed of two separate dsRNA molecules encoding RdRp and CP. Notably, the CP of CSpV1 is smaller than that of other partitiviruses, indicating a unique capsid structure. Biologically, CSpV1 appears to be primarily transmitted through intracellular methods and is associated with non-aggressive infections. Its impact on altering Cryptosporidium's pathogenicity remains to be fully understood. CSpV1 exhibits unique genomic and coding characteristics, with its dsRNA segments having distinct nucleotide sequences (often detected via PCR). The virus is believed to employ a non-standard mechanism for translation, and conserved sequences at the 3′ ends of its dsRNAs might be involved in replication or packaging processes. CSpV1 holds practical significance in the detection of Cryptosporidium in contaminated water supplies and in the epidemiological monitoring of Cryptosporidium infections.

== Structure ==
Viruses in Cryspovirus are non-enveloped, with icosahedral geometries, and T=1 symmetry. The diameter is around 30-35 nm. Genomes are linear and segmented, around 2.1kb in length. The genome codes for 2 proteins.

Genus	Structure	Symmetry	Capsid	Genomic arrangement	Genomic segmentation
Cryspovirus	Icosahedral	T=1	Non-enveloped	Linear	Segmented

== Life cycle ==
Viral replication is cytoplasmic. Entry into the host cell is achieved by penetration into the host cell. Replication follows the double-stranded RNA virus replication model. Double-stranded RNA virus transcription is the method of transcription. Protists serve as the natural host.

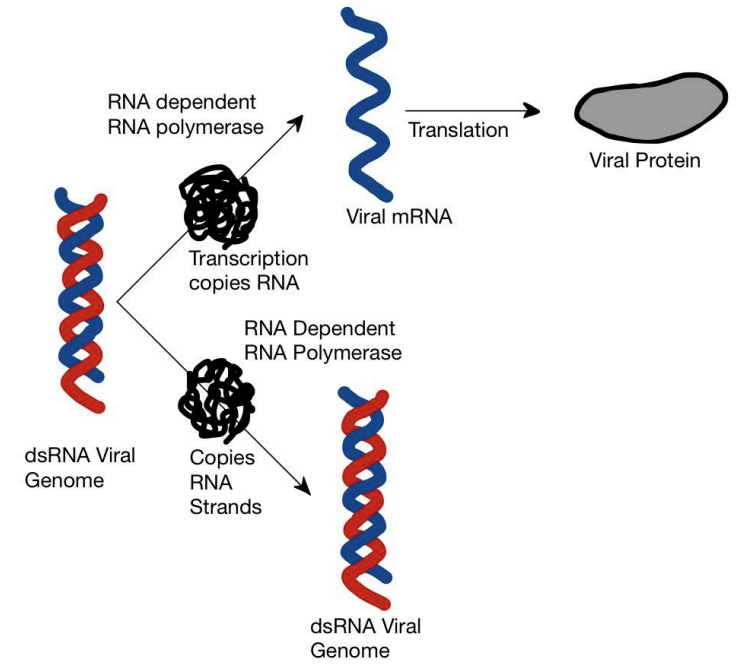
Double-stranded RNA makes mRNA and genomic RNA using RNA-dependent RNA polymerase

Genus	Host details	Tissue tropism	Entry details	Release details	Replication site	Assembly site	Transmission
Cryspovirus	Protists	None	Cell division; sporogenesis; hyphal anastomosis	Cell division; sporogenesis; hyphal anastomosis	Cytoplasm	Cytoplasm	Cell division; sporogenesis; hyphal anastomosis
