= Streptomyces phage Φ0 =

Virus classification
- (unranked): Virus
- Realm: Riboviria
- Kingdom: Orthornavirae
- Phylum: Duplornaviricota
- Class: Vidaverviricetes
- Order: Mindivirales
- Family: Cystoviridae (?)
- Virus: Streptomyces phage Φ0

Viral bacteria

Streptomyces phage Φ0 is a bacteriophage that infects Streptomyces. It was discovered in 2016. The bacteriophage contains a double-stranded RNA genome and probably belongs to the Cystoviridae family.
