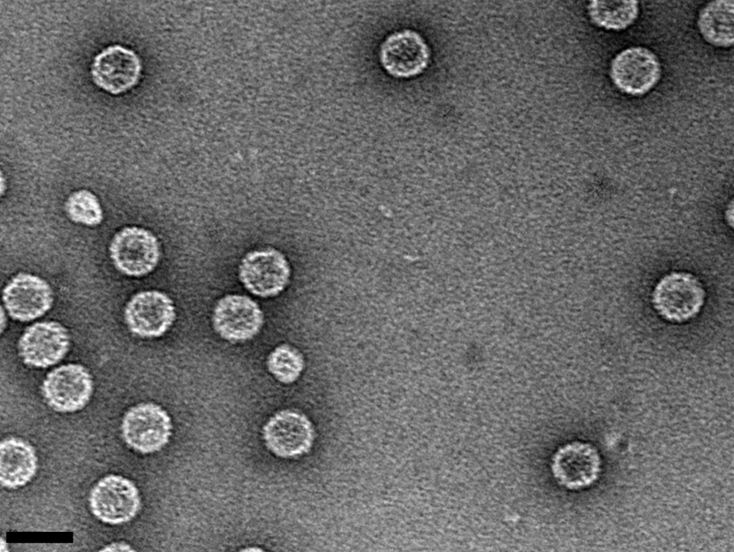
- Electron micrograph of human picobirnavirus particles

Virus classification
- (unranked): Virus
- Realm: Riboviria
- Kingdom: Orthornavirae
- Phylum: Pisuviricota
- Class: Duplopiviricetes
- Order: Durnavirales
- Family: Picobirnaviridae
- Genus: Orthopicobirnavirus

Synonyms
- Picobirnavirus

= Orthopicobirnavirus =

Genus of viruses

Orthopicobirnavirus is a genus of double-stranded RNA viruses. It is the only genus in the family Picobirnaviridae. Although amniotes, especially mammals, were thought to serve as hosts, it has been recently suggested that these viruses might infect bacteria. If they do infect bacteria, then they are bacteriophages. There are three species in this genus. Associated symptoms include gastroenteritis in animals and humans, though the disease association is unclear.

== Etymology ==
Picobirnaviruses are a small (pico, Spanish for small), bisegmented (bi, Latin for two), double-stranded RNA virus. Picobirnaviruses were initially considered to be birna-like viruses, and the name was derived from birnavirus (bisegmented RNA), but the virions are much smaller (diameter 35 nm vs. 65 nm). Picobirnaviruses were first detected in humans and black-footed pigmy rice rats in 1988.

== Structure ==
Viruses in the genus are non-enveloped, with icosahedral geometries, and T=3 symmetry. The diameter is around 35–40 nm.

== Genome ==
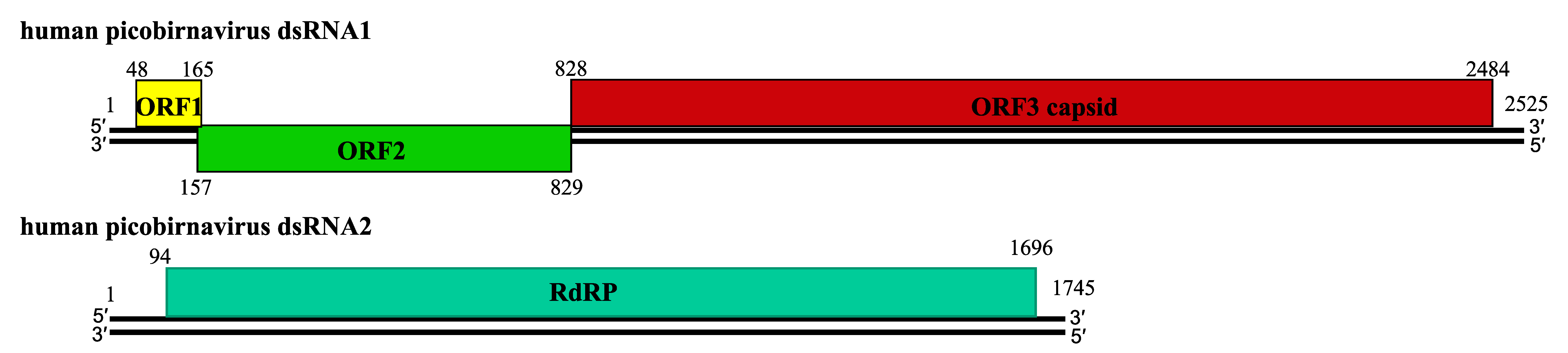
Genome arrangement of dsRNA1 and dsRNA2 of human picobirnavirus

The genome is linear, bipartite, and composed of double-stranded RNA. It includes a segment 1 which is 2.2–2.7 kilobases (kb) in length and a segment 2 which is 1.2–1.9 kb in length. The genome codes for three to four proteins. The capsid protein gene is encoded by the second open reading frame of the larger genomic segment 1.

Picobirnaviruses are divided into two genogroups on the basis of the sequence of segment 2. The RNA-dependent RNA polymerase (RdRp) is encoded by segment 2. The group viruses have been isolated from humans and other mammals, as well as birds and squamates.

== Life cycle ==
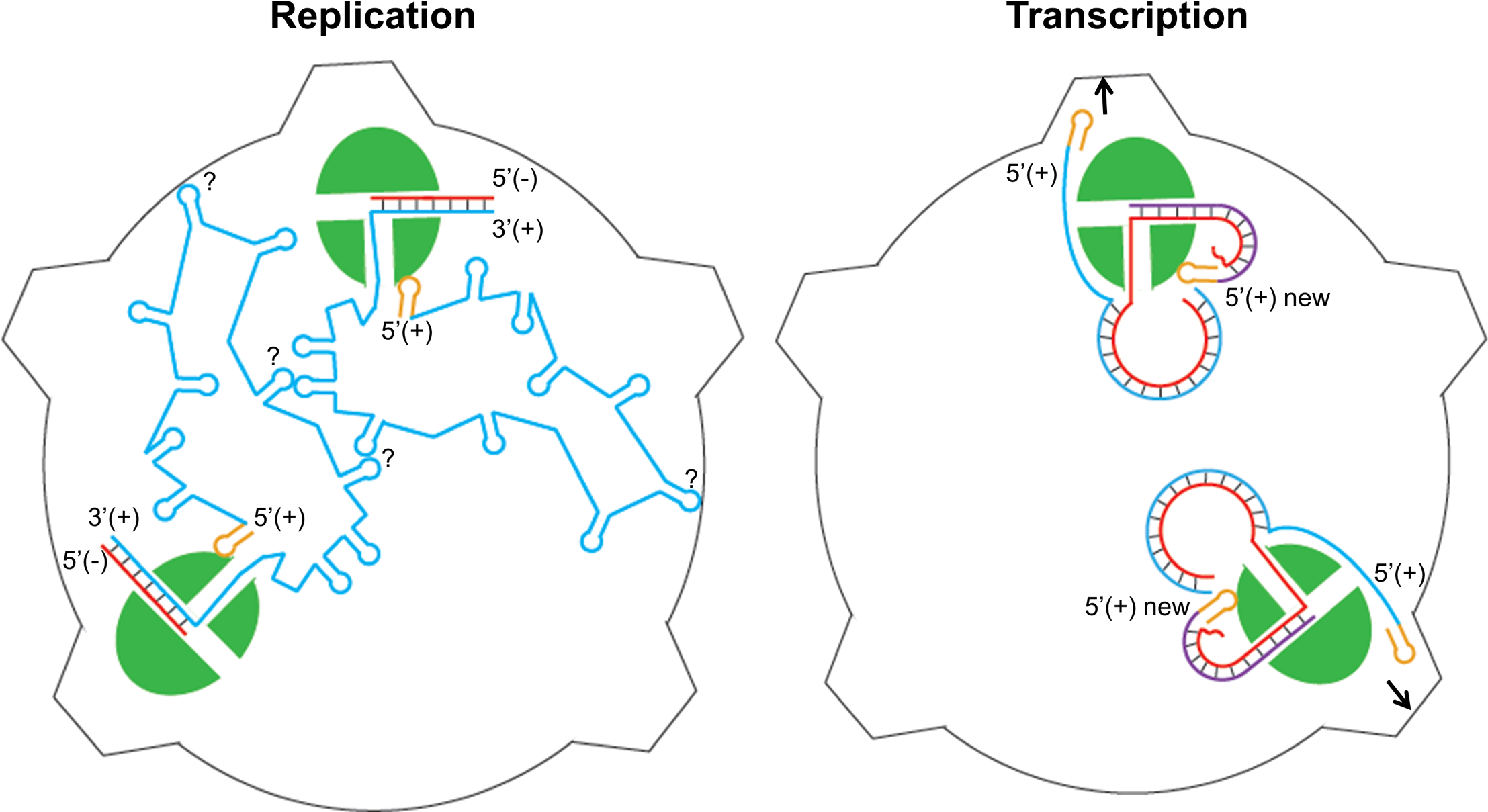
Picobirnavirus RdRp replication (L) and transcription (R) in the viral capsid.

Picobirnaviruses target intestine tissue. Entry into the host cell is achieved by penetration into the host cell. Once in the host cell, viral replication is cytoplasmic. Replication follows the double-stranded RNA virus replication model. Double-stranded RNA virus transcription is the method of transcription. The viruses are released from the cell by budding. Mammals serve as the natural host. Transmission routes are fecal-oral.

== Taxonomy ==
Picobirnaviruses were initially thought to belong to the family Birnaviridae, but later were confirmed to differ with respect to host, virion size, capsid, RNA-dependent RNA polymerase, genome size, and organization. The family Picobirnaviridae is now classified distinctly and composed of one genus Orthopicobirnavirus, which has three species:

- Orthopicobirnavirus beihaiense (Beihai picobirnavirus)
- Orthopicobirnavirus equi (Equine picobirnavirus)
- Orthopicobirnavirus hominis (Human picobirnavirus)
