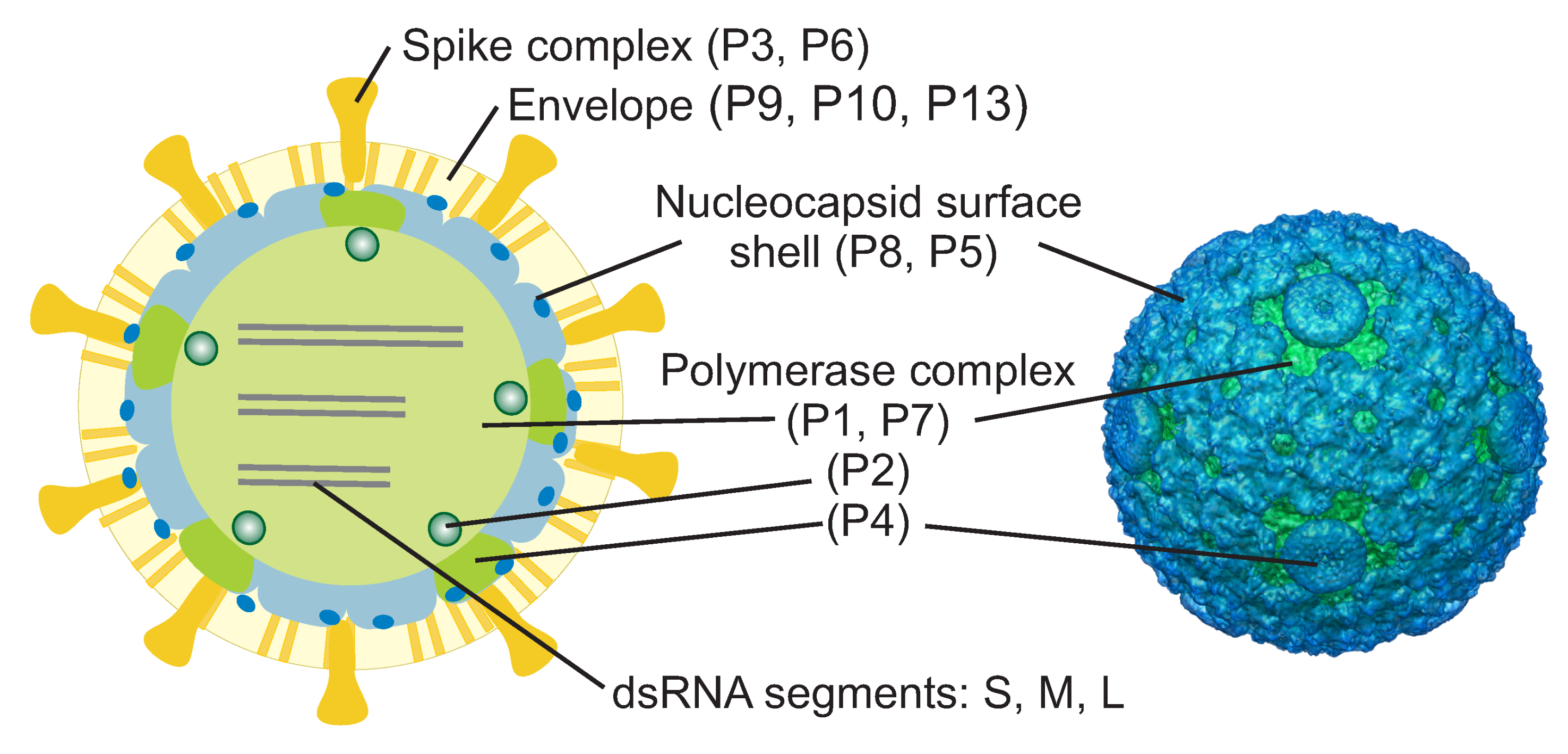

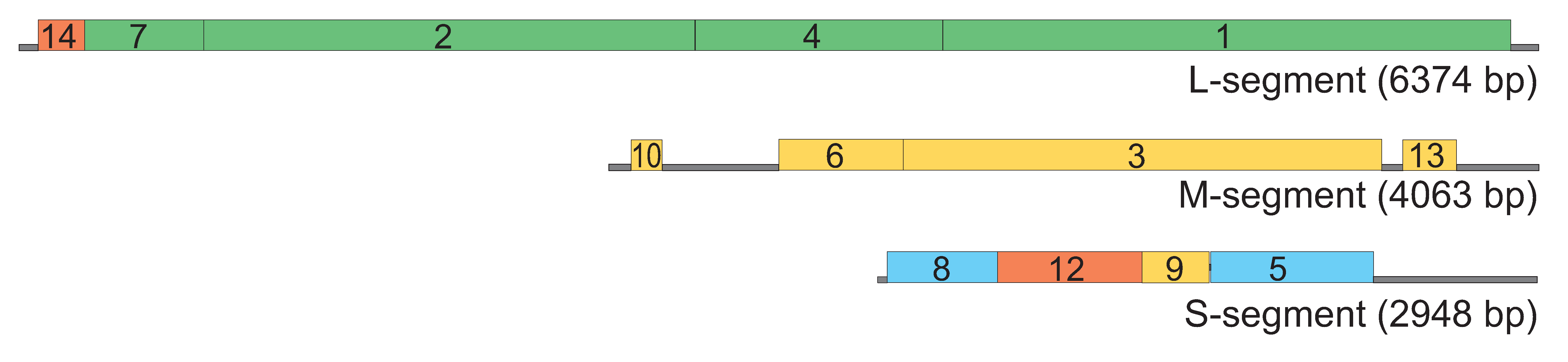
- Pseudomonas phage phi6 particle, reconstruction, and genome

Virus classification
- (unranked): Virus
- Realm: Riboviria
- Kingdom: Orthornavirae
- Phylum: Duplornaviricota
- Class: Vidaverviricetes
- Order: Mindivirales
- Family: Cystoviridae

Genera and species
- See text

= Cystovirus =

Cystoviridae

Family of viruses

Cystoviruses are a family of double-stranded RNA viruses that infect bacteria. They constitute the family Cystoviridae. The name of the group cysto derives from Greek kystis which means bladder or sack. There are seven genera in this family.

== Discovery ==
Pseudomonas virus phi6 was the first virus in this family to be discovered and was initially characterized in 1973 by Anne Vidaver at the University of Nebraska–Lincoln. She found that when she cultured the bacterial strain Pseudomonas phaseolicola HB1OY with halo blight infected bean straw, cytopathic effects were detected in cultured lawns, indicating that there was a lytic microbe or bacteriophage present.

In 1999, phi7–14 were identified by the laboratory of Leonard Mindich at the Public Health Research Institute associated with New York University. They did this by culturing various leaves in Lysogeny Broth and then plating the broth on lawns of Pseudomonas syringae pv phaseolicola. They were able to identify viral plaques from this and then subsequently sequence their genomes.

== Microbiology ==
=== Structure ===
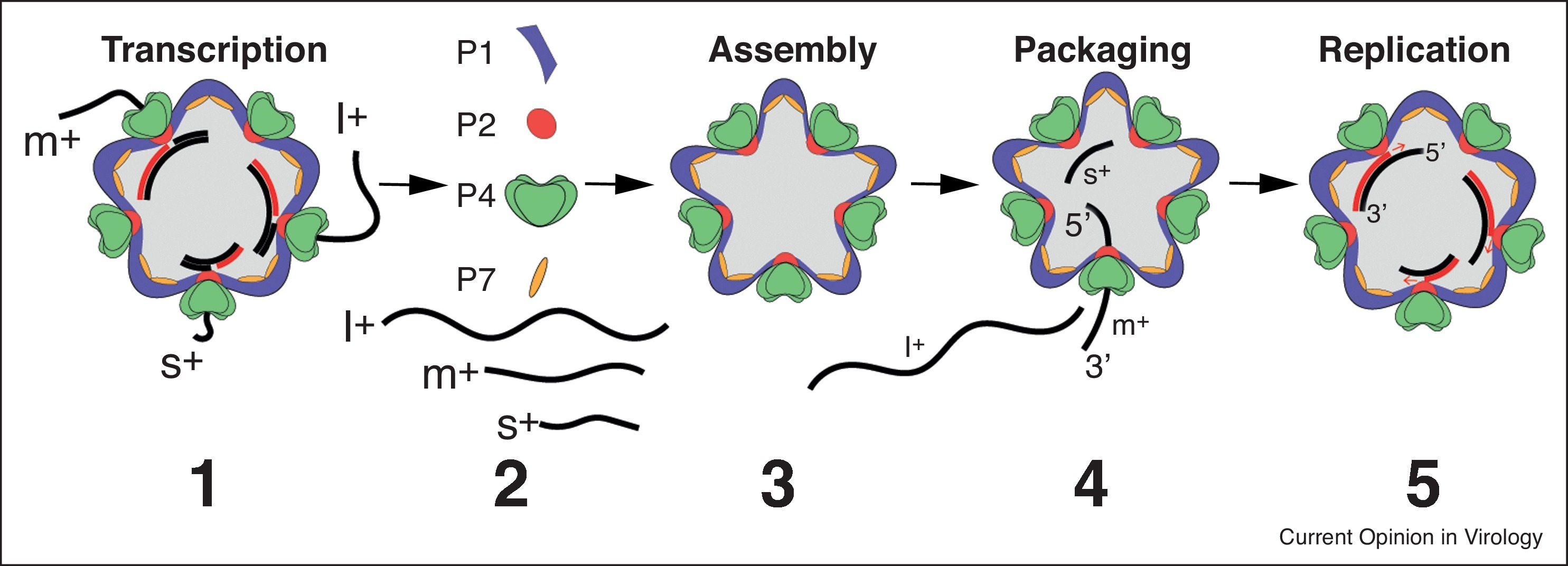
Virion assembly and pre-genome packaging of family Cystoviridae

Cystovirus particles are enveloped, with icosahedral and spherical geometries, and T=13, T=2 symmetry. The virion diameter is around 85 nm.

=== Genome ===
Cystoviruses have a tripartite double-stranded RNA genome which is approximately 14 kbp in total length. The genome is linear and segmented, and labeled as large (L) 6.4 kbp, medium (M) 4 kbp, and small (S) 2.9 kb in length. The genome codes for twelve proteins.

=== Life cycle ===
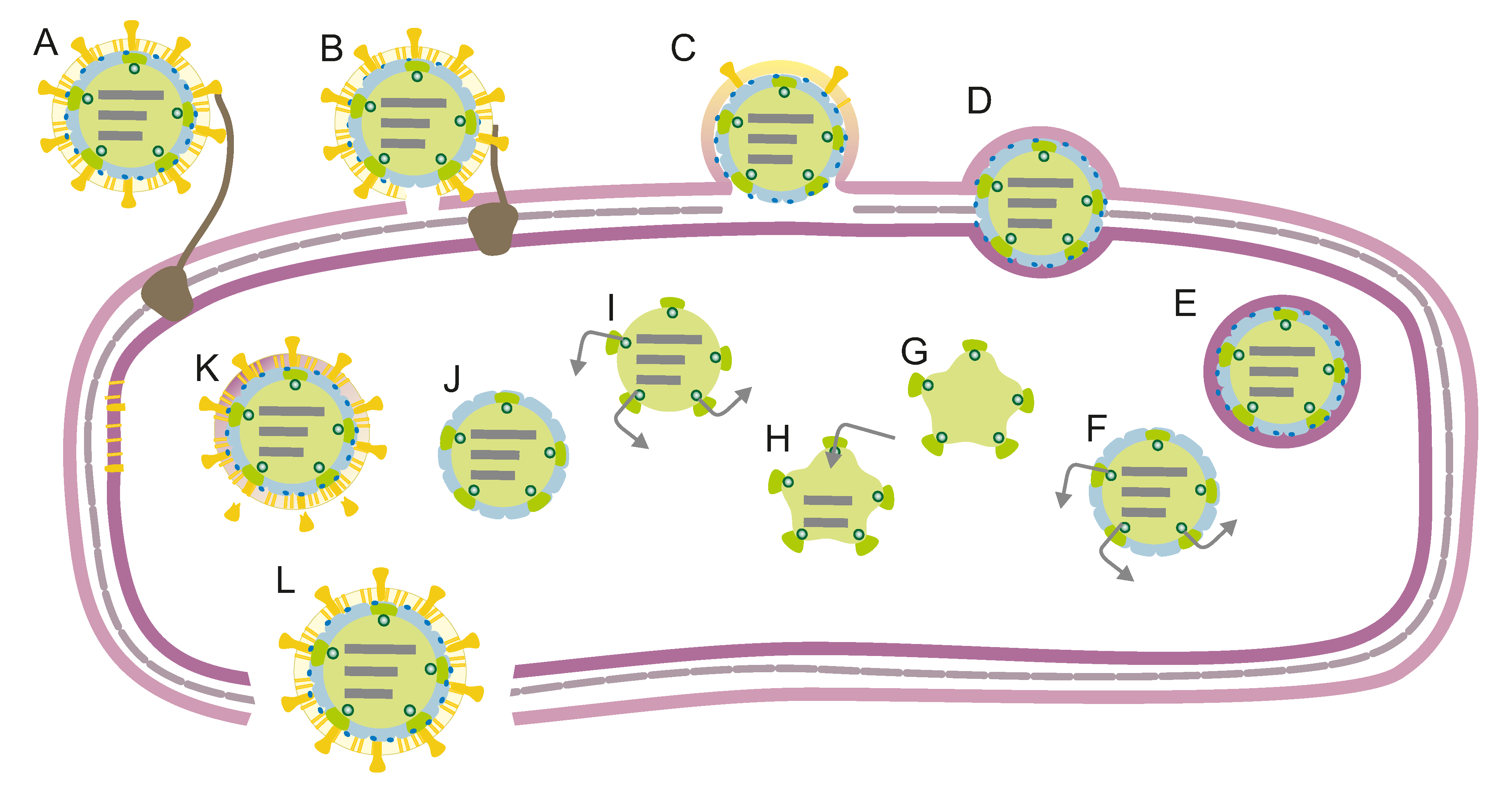
Life cycle of cystoviruses

Cystoviruses enter the bacteria by adsorption on its pilus and then membrane fusion. Viral replication is cytoplasmic. Replication follows the double-stranded RNA virus replication model. Double-stranded RNA virus transcription is the method of transcription. The progeny viruses are released from the cell by lysis.

Most identified cystoviruses infect Pseudomonas species, but this is likely biased due to the method of screening and enrichment. There are many proposed members of this family. Pseudomonas viruses φ7, φ8, φ9, φ10, φ11, φ12, and φ13 have been identified and named, but other cystovirus-like viruses have also been isolated. These seven putative relatives are classified as either close (φ7, φ9, φ10, φ11) or distant (φ8, φ12, φ13) relatives to φ6, with the distant relatives thought to infect via the LPS rather than the pili.

However, cystoviruses do not only infect Pseudomonas. But also bacteria of the genera Streptomyces, Microvirgula, Acinetobacter, Lactococcus, Pectobacterium, and possibly other bacterial genera.

== Taxonomy ==
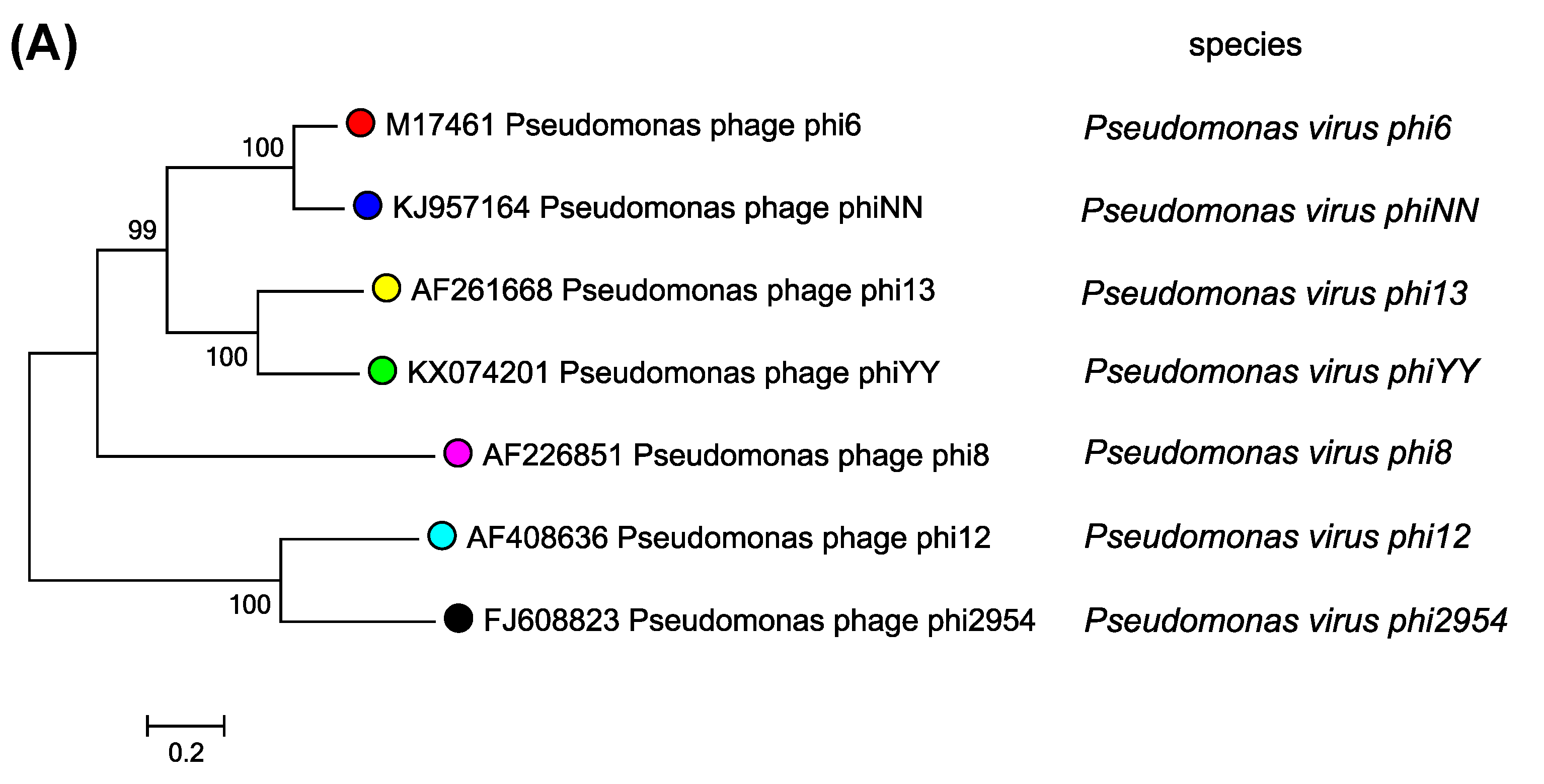
Phylogenetic tree of cystoviruses

The family contains the following genera and species (-virus denotes genus):

- Alphacystovirus
  - Alphacystovirus phi8
- Betacystovirus
  - Betacystovirus phi12
- Deltacystovirus
  - Deltacystovirus phi2954
- Epsiloncystovirus
  - Epsiloncystovirus phiNY
- Gammacystovirus
  - Gammacystovirus phi13
  - Gammacystovirus phiYY
- Orthocystovirus
  - Orthocystovirus phi6
  - Orthocystovirus phiNN
- Zetacystovirus
  - Zetacystovirus CAP

Other unassigned phages:

- Streptomyces virus phi0
- Lactococcus virus phi7-4
- Pectobacterium virus MA14
- Acinetobacter virus CAP3
- Acinetobacter virus CAP4
- Acinetobacter virus CAP5
- Acinetobacter virus CAP6
- Acinetobacter virus CAP7
