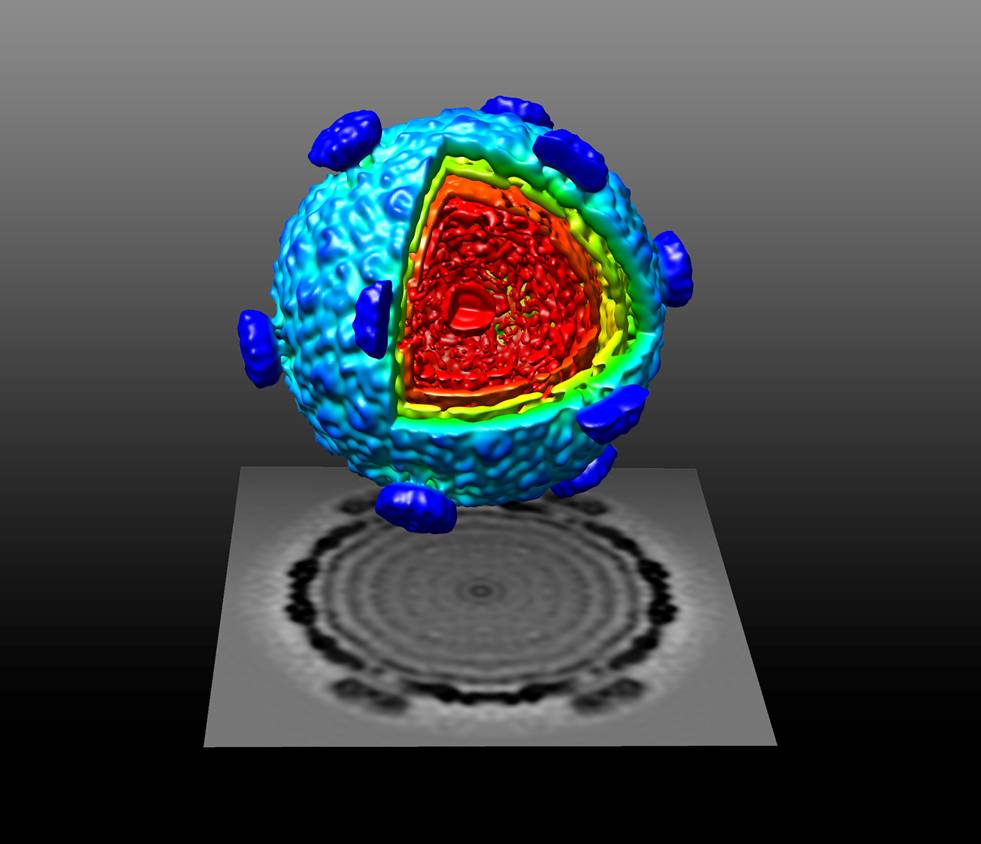
- The RNA-packaged procapsid (protein shell) of Pseudomonas virus phi6
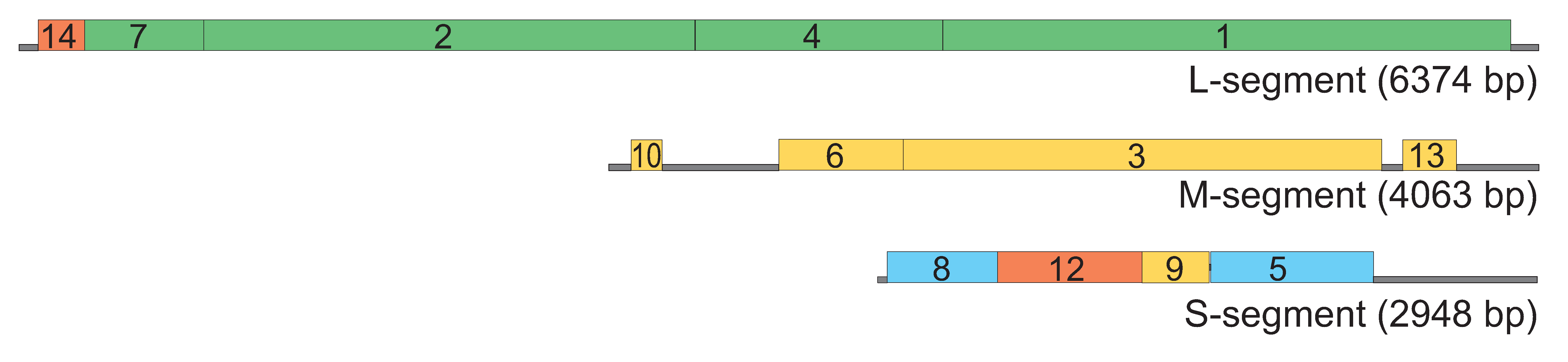
- Genome of Pseudomonas virus phi6

Virus classification
- (unranked): Virus
- Realm: Riboviria
- Kingdom: Orthornavirae
- Phylum: Duplornaviricota
- Class: Vidaverviricetes
- Order: Mindivirales
- Family: Cystoviridae
- Genus: Orthocystovirus
- Species: Orthocystovirus phi6

Synonyms
- Phage phi6; Pseudomonas phage phi6

= Pseudomonas virus phi6 =

Bacteriophage phi6

Species of virus

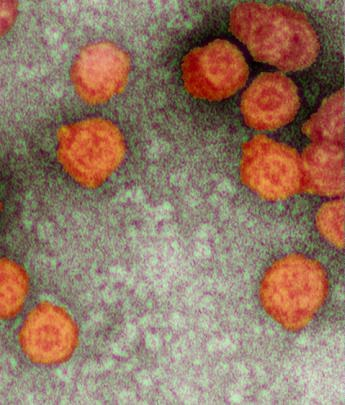
Virions of Pseudomonas virus phi6, colored

Φ6 (Phi 6) is the best-studied bacteriophage of the virus family Cystoviridae. It infects Pseudomonas bacteria (typically plant-pathogenic P. syringae). It has a three-part, segmented, double-stranded RNA genome, totalling ~13.5 kb in length. Φ6 and its relatives have a lipid membrane around their nucleocapsid, a rare trait among bacteriophages. It is a lytic phage, though under certain circumstances has been observed to display a delay in lysis which may be described as a "carrier state".

== Proteins ==
The genome of Φ6 codes for 12 proteins. P1 is a major capsid protein which is responsible of forming the skeleton of the polymerase complex. In the interior of the shell formed by P1 is the P2 viral replicase and transcriptase protein. The spikes binding to receptors on the Φ6 virion are formed by the protein P3. P4 is a nucleoside-triphosphatase which is required for the genome packaging and transcription. P5 is a lytic enzyme. The spike protein P3 is anchored to a fusogenic envelope protein in P6. P7 is a minor capsid protein, P8 is responsible of forming the nucleocapsid surface shell and P9 is a major envelope protein. P12 is a non-structural morphogenic protein shown to be a part of the envelope assembly. P10 and P13 are proteins coding genes that are associated with the viral envelope and P14 is a non-structural protein.

== Life cycle ==
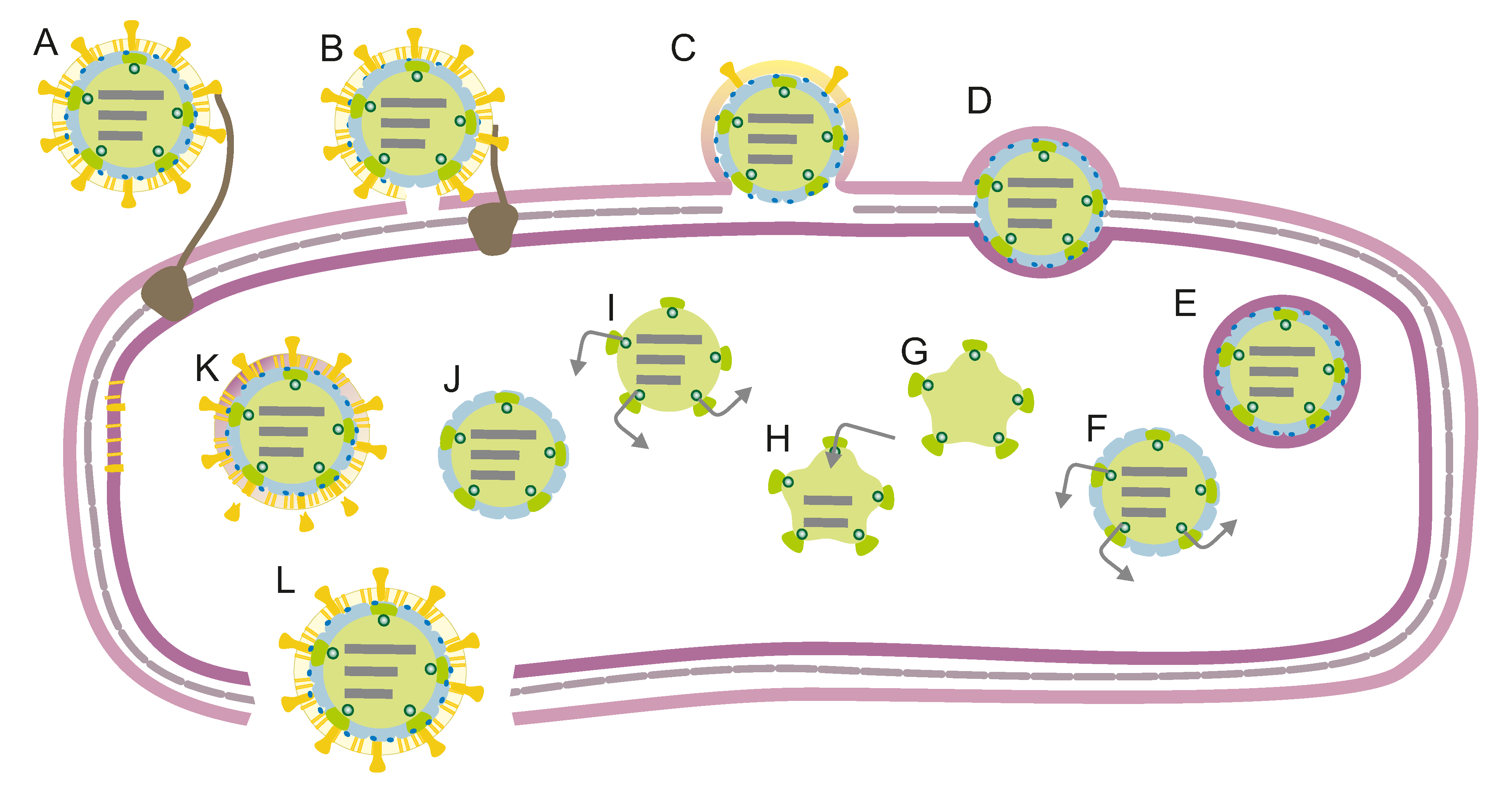
Life cycle of phage phi6

Φ6 typically attaches to the Type IV pilus of P. syringae with its attachment protein, P3. It is thought that the cell then retracts its pilus, pulling the phage toward the bacterium. Fusion of the viral envelope with the bacterial outer membrane is facilitated by the phage protein, P6. The muralytic (peptidoglycan-digesting) enzyme, P5, then digests a portion of the cell wall, and the nucleocapsid enters the cell coated with the bacterial outer membrane.

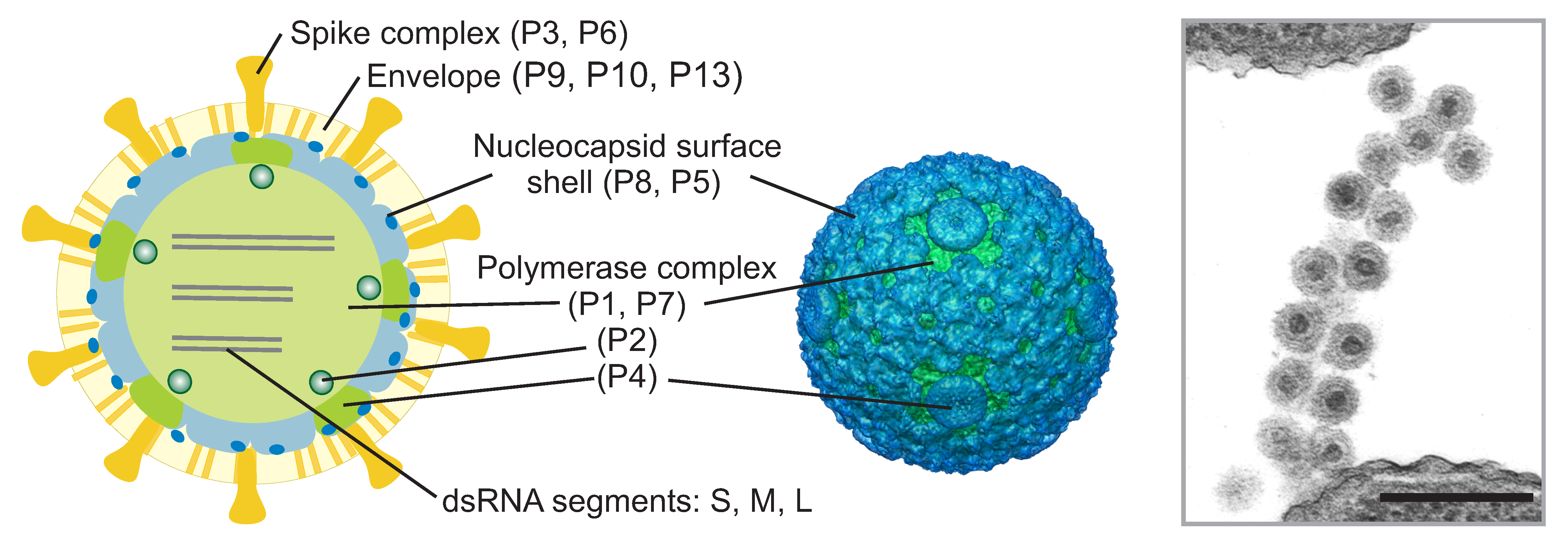
Diagram, three dimensional reconstruction, and EM of phage Φ6

A copy of the sense strand of the large genome segment (6374 bases) is then synthesized (transcription) on the vertices of the capsid, with the RNA-dependent RNA polymerase, P2, and released into the host cell cytosol. The four proteins translated from the large segment spontaneously assemble into procapsids, which then package a large segment sense strand, polymerizing its complement during entry through the P2 polymerase-containing vertices. While the large segment is being translated (expressed) and synthesized (replicated), the parental phage releases copies of the sense strands of the medium segment (4061 bases) and small segment (2948 bases) into the cytosol. They are translated, and packaged into the procapsids in order: medium then small. The filled capsids are then coated with the nucleocapsid protein P8, and then outer membrane proteins somehow attract bacterial inner membrane, which then envelopes the nucleocapsid.

The lytic protein, P5, is contained between the P8 nucleocapsid shell and the viral envelope. The completed phage progeny remain in the cytosol until sufficient levels of the lytic protein P5 degrade the host cell wall. The cytosol then bursts forth, disrupting the outer membrane, releasing the phage. The bacterium is killed by this lysis.

== RNA-dependent RNA polymerase ==
RNA-dependent RNA polymerases (RdRPs) are critical components in the life cycle of double-stranded RNA (dsRNA) viruses. However, it is not fully understood how these important enzymes function during viral replication. Expression and characterization of the purified recombinant RdRP of Φ6 is the first direct demonstration of RdRP activity catalyzed by a single protein from a dsRNA virus. The recombinant Φ6 RdRP is highly active in vitro, possesses RNA replication and transcription activities, and is capable of using both homologous and heterologous RNA molecules as templates. The crystal structure of the Φ6 polymerase, solved in complex with a number of ligands, provides insights towards understanding the mechanism of primer-independent initiation of RNA-dependent RNA polymerization. This RNA polymerase appears to operate without a sigma factor/subunit. The purified Φ6 RdRP displays processive elongation in vitro and self-assembles along with polymerase complex proteins into subviral particles that are fully functional.

== Research ==
Φ6 has been studied as a model to understand how segmented RNA viruses package their genomes, its structure has been studied by scientists interested in lipid-containing bacteriophages, and it has been used as a model organism to test evolutionary theory such as Muller's ratchet. Phage Φ6 has been used extensively in additional phage experimental evolution studies.

== See also ==
- Double-stranded RNA viruses
