= Wound tumor virus =

Virus classification
- (unranked): Virus
- Realm: Riboviria
- Kingdom: Orthornavirae
- Phylum: Duplornaviricota
- Class: Resentoviricetes
- Order: Reovirales
- Family: Sedoreoviridae
- Genus: Phytoreovirus
- Species: Phytoreovirus vulnustumoris

Species of virus

Wound tumor virus is an invertebrate and plant virus found in the United States of America belonging to the genus Phytoreovirus and the family Sedoreoviridae. It is a type III virus under the Baltimore classification system; that is it has a double-stranded RNA genome. This genome is approximately 25,000 base pairs long and organised into twelve segments. All the viral replication occurs in the cytoplasm. The virus is 22% RNA by weight, the other 78% being structural proteins.

Structurally, the virus is constructed from 7 different structural proteins. The capsid has icosahedral symmetry, is non-enveloped and around 70 nm in diameter. There is an inner-shell with a diameter of around 50 nm.

More than 50 species of plants are potential hosts for Wound tumor virus. It was first reported in Melilotus officinalis. The virus causes tumors to form on the plant at the stem and roots – with the root tumors being more severe.

The virus is spread by an insect vector – the leaf hopper family, notably 'Agallia constricta'. Since viral replication occurs relatively independently of cellular processes, the virus also replicates in the insect vector.
