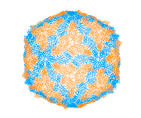
- Cryo-EM of protein capsid structure of rice dwarf virus (RDV)

Virus classification
- (unranked): Virus
- Realm: Riboviria
- Kingdom: Orthornavirae
- Phylum: Duplornaviricota
- Class: Resentoviricetes
- Order: Reovirales
- Family: Sedoreoviridae
- Genus: Phytoreovirus

= Phytoreovirus =

Genus of viruses

Phytoreovirus is a genus of viruses, in the order Reovirales, in the family Sedoreoviridae. They are non-turreted reoviruses that are major agricultural pathogens, particularly in Asia. Oryza sativa for RDV and RGDV, dicotyledonous for WTV, and leafhoppers serve as natural hosts. There are three species in this genus. Diseases associated with this genus include: WTV: galls (tumor). RDV: dwarf (or stunt) disease of rice. RGDV: dwarfing, stunting, and galls.

== Classification ==
One member of this family, Rice dwarf virus (RDV), has been extensively studied by electron cryomicroscopy and x-ray crystallography. From these analyses, atomic models of the capsid proteins and a plausible model for capsid assembly have been derived. While the structural proteins of RDV share no sequence similarity to other proteins, their folds and the overall capsid structure are similar to those of other reoviruses.

Phytoreoviruses are unique among reoviruses in that there are 12 dsRNA segments in each virus. Like all other reoviruses, they contain their own RNA-dependent RNA polymerase, allowing for endogenous synthesis of viral mRNA within the virus. Although less well studied than orthoreovirus and orbivirus, considerable structural and biochemical studies have been undertaken to characterize phytoreoviruses, which in general infect plants. There are three recognized phytoreoviruses: Wound tumour virus (WTV), Rice dwarf virus (RDV) and Rice gall dwarf virus (RGDV). Possible additional family members include tobacco leaf enation virus (TLEF), rice bunchy stunt virus and sweet potato virus (ICTV, VIDE). There are also several RDV isolates, all of which share over 90% sequence identity. Of these phytoreoviruses, RDV has been extensively studied and is the best characterized member. Most of our knowledge about phytoreovirus assembly and structure is based on structural data accumulated in RDV studies.

=== Taxonomy ===
The genus contains the following species, listed by scientific name and followed by the exemplar virus of the species:

- Phytoreovirus alphaoryzae, Rice dwarf virus
- Phytoreovirus betaoryzae, Rice gall dwarf virus
- Phytoreovirus vulnustumoris, Wound tumor virus

== Structure ==
Viruses in Phytoreovirus are non-enveloped, with icosahedral geometries, and T=13, T=2 symmetry. The diameter is around 70 nm. Genomes are linear and segmented. Segments range in size from 1066 to 4423 base pairs, resulting in a total genome length of around 26kb. The genome codes for 15 proteins and has 4 open reading frames.

Genus	Structure	Symmetry	Capsid	Genomic arrangement	Genomic segmentation
Phytoreovirus	Icosahedral	T=13, T=2	Non-enveloped	Linear	Segmented

== Life cycle ==
Viral replication is cytoplasmic. Entry into the host cell is achieved by penetration into the host cell. Replication follows the double-stranded RNA virus replication model. Double-stranded RNA virus transcription is the method of transcription. The virus exits the host cell by monopartite non-tubule guided viral movement. Oryza sativa for RDV and RGDV and dicotyledonous for WTV serve as the natural host. The virus is transmitted via a vector (insect mechanical inoculation in plant by leafhoppers). Transmission routes are vector and mechanical.

Genus	Host details	Tissue tropism	Entry details	Release details	Replication site	Assembly site	Transmission
Phytoreovirus	Oryza sativa; leafhoppers	Phloem	Viral movement; mechanical inoculation	Cell death	Cytoplasm	Cytoplasm	Leafhoppers

== See also ==
- Microbiology
- Virology
- RNA virus
- Animal virology
