= Ambiviricota =

Virus classification
- (unranked): Virus
- Realm: Riboviria
- Kingdom: Orthornavirae
- Phylum: Ambiviricota

Classes
- Suforviricetes; Crytulvirales; Unambiviridae; Dumbiviridae; Trimbiviridae; Quambiviridae

Phylum of RNA viruses

Ambiviricota is a phylum of ambisense, single-stranded RNA viruses that infect fungi. These RNA virus genomes contain at least two open reading frames in a non-overlapping ambisense orientation. The ambisense structure allows the virus to encode two proteins on opposite strands of RNA. Ambivirus genomes replicate using a rolling-circle mechanism and form a rod-like structure containing ribozymes in both sense and antisense orientations, similar to viroids—small, circular infectious agents that also utilize ribozymes.

Ambiviruses have been found to infect various species of fungi, making them an important area of study for understanding viral interactions within these hosts. At least four major fungal taxonomic divisions are known to host ambiviruses: Ascomycota (sac fungi), Basidiomycota (club fungi, which include mushrooms), Chytridiomycota (primitive fungi), and Glomeromycota (fungi that form symbiotic relationships with plants). This broad host range suggests that ambiviruses may play a significant role in fungal ecology, potentially affecting both fungal reproduction and interactions with other organisms.

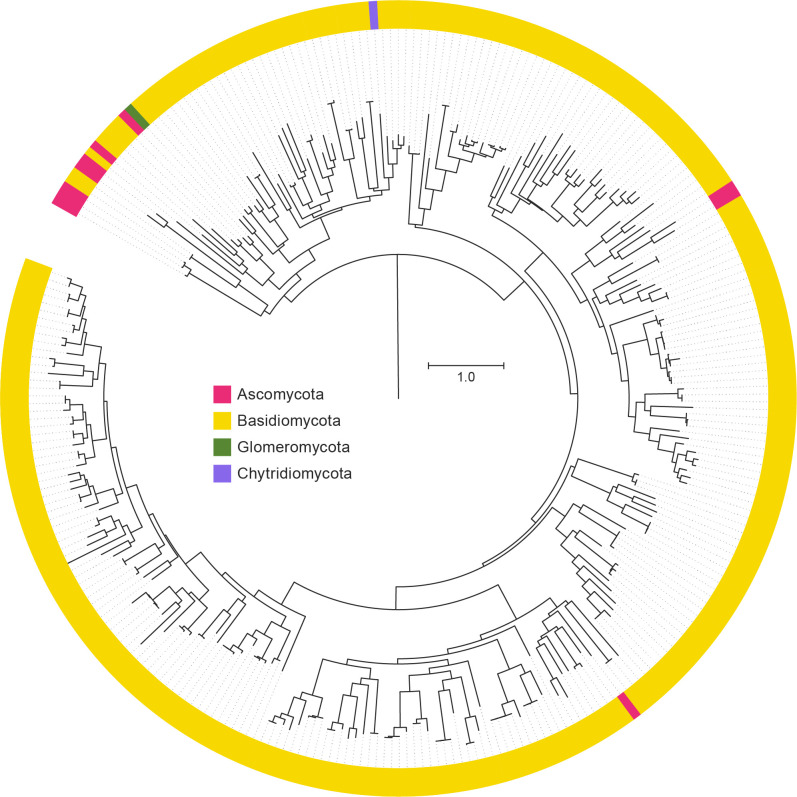
Phylogenetic tree showing diversity of fungi infected by ambiviruses

The name Ambiviricota is derived from the Latin word "ambi", meaning "both", referring to the non-overlapping ambisense orientation of the open reading frames in its taxon members' genomes. The suffix "-viricota" indicates its classification as a viral phylum.
