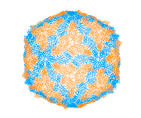
- Cryo-EM of protein capsid structure of rice dwarf virus (RDV)

Virus classification
- (unranked): Virus
- Realm: Riboviria
- Kingdom: Orthornavirae
- Phylum: Duplornaviricota
- Class: Resentoviricetes
- Order: Reovirales
- Family: Sedoreoviridae
- Genus: Phytoreovirus
- Species: Phytoreovirus alphaoryzae

= Rice dwarf virus =

Species of virus

Rice dwarf virus (RDV) is a plant pathogenic virus of the family Sedoreoviridae, genus Phytoreovirus.
