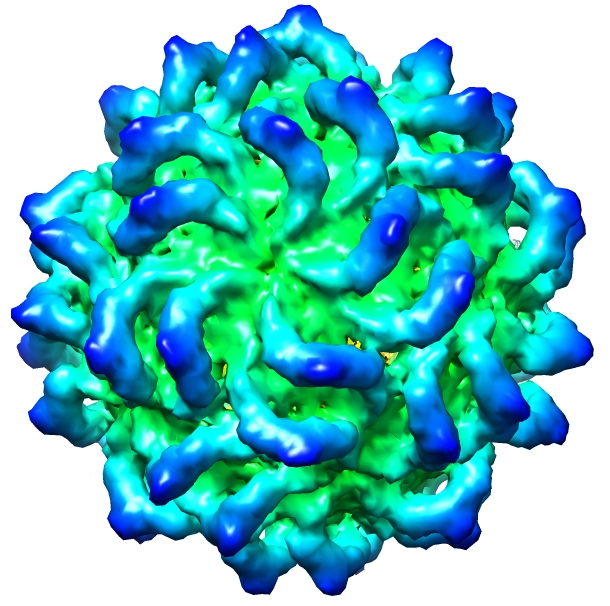
- CryoEM of Penicillium stoloniferum virus S capsid, EMD-5161
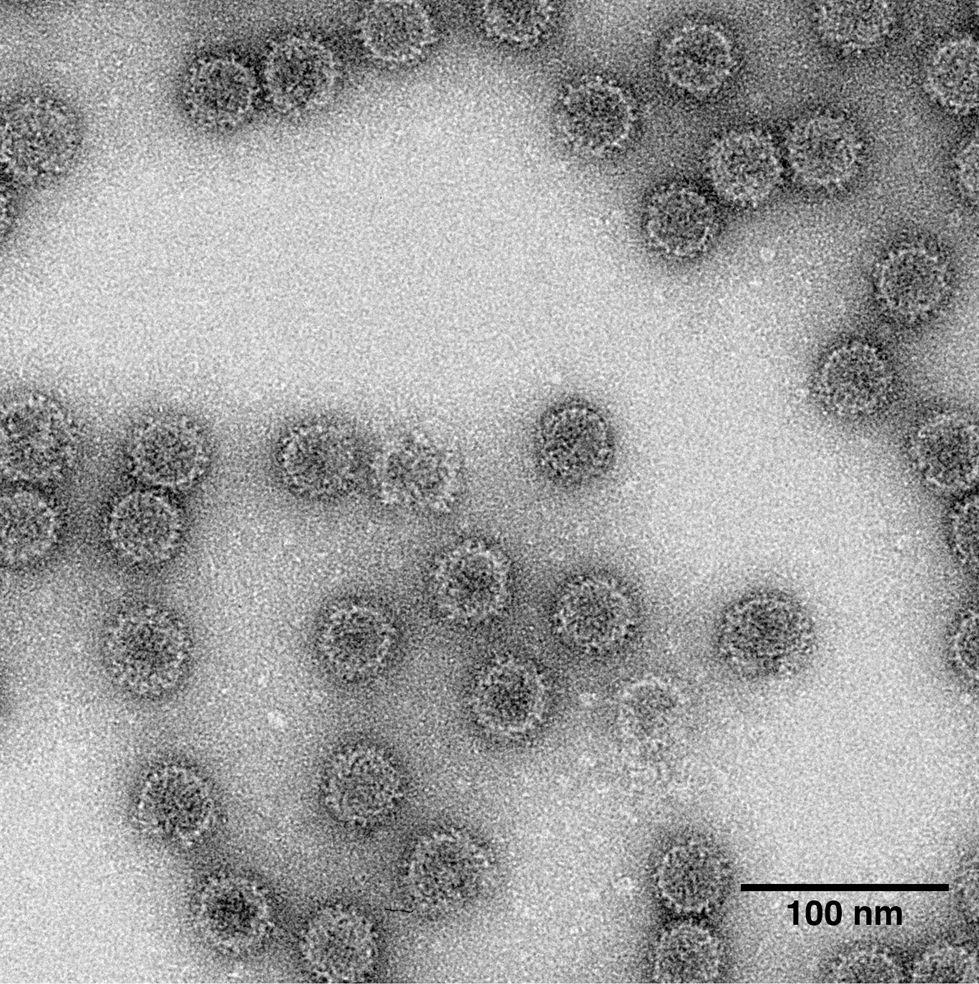
- TEM of Penicillium stoloniferum virus S

Virus classification
- (unranked): Virus
- Realm: Riboviria
- Kingdom: Orthornavirae
- Phylum: Pisuviricota
- Class: Duplopiviricetes
- Order: Durnavirales
- Family: Partitiviridae

= Partitiviridae =

Family of viruses

Partitiviridae is a family of multipartite double-stranded RNA viruses. Plants, fungi, and protozoa serve as natural hosts. It has been suggested that they can also infect bacteria. The name comes from the Latin partitius, which means divided, and refers to the segmented genome of partitiviruses. The family contains five genera.

== Structure ==
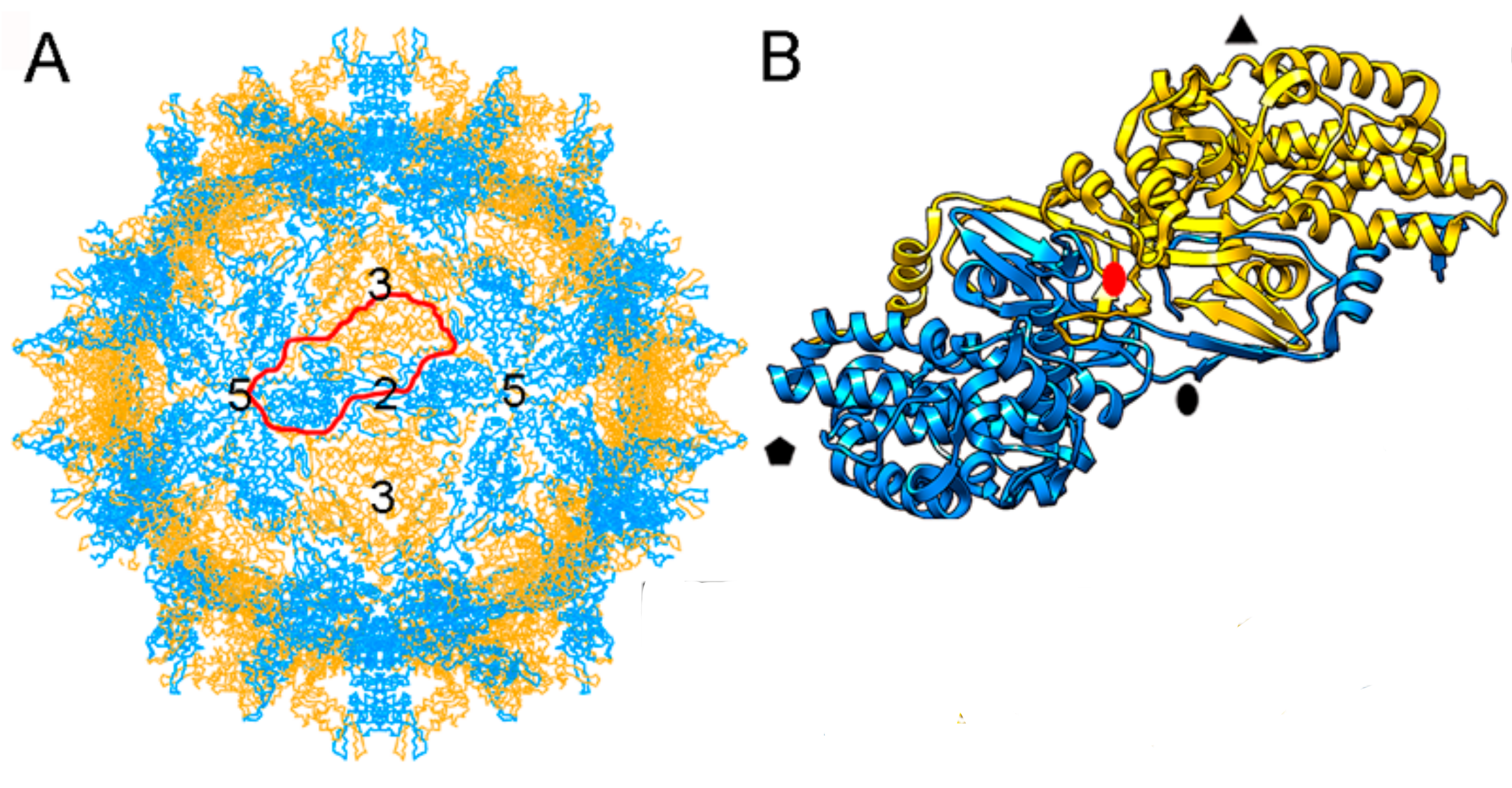
Penicillium stoloniferum virus F (PsV-F), Gammapartititvirus, and PsV-F CP dimer

Viruses in the family Partitiviridae are non-enveloped with icosahedral geometries and T=1 symmetry. The diameter of partitiviruses is around 25–43 nm.

== Genome ==
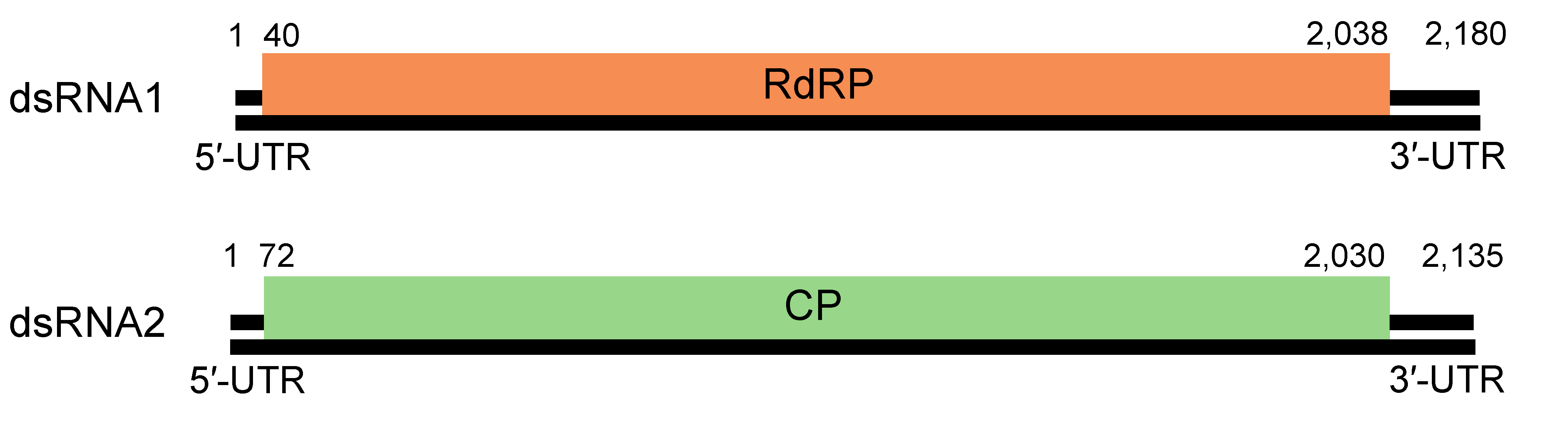
Genome of atkinsonella hypoxylon virus (AhV) of genus Betapartitivirus

Partitiviruses have double-stranded RNA genomes divided into two genomic segments, and there may be additional subgenomic segments. The two genome segments are packaged in separate virus particles. They code for two separate proteins. The first segment codes for the RNA-dependent RNA polymerase (RdRp), and the second segment codes for the coat protein. The segments are around 1.4–3.0 kbp in length, while the total genome length is around 3.0–4.8 kbp.

== Life cycle ==
Viral replication is cytoplasmic. Entry into the host cell is achieved by penetration into the host cell. Replication follows the double-stranded RNA virus replication model. Double-stranded RNA virus transcription is the method of transcription. The virus exits the host cell by cell-to-cell movement. Fungi and plants serve as the natural host. Cryspoviruses infect apicomplexan protozoa of the genus Cryptosporidium, while viruses of the other genera infect plants and fungi. It has been suggested that they can also infect bacteria.

Genus	Host details	Tissue tropism	Entry details	Release details	Replication site	Assembly site	Transmission
Cryspovirus	Protists	None	Cell division; sporogenesis; hyphal anastomosis	Cell division; sporogenesis; hyphal anastomosis	Cytoplasm	Cytoplasm	Cell division; sporogenesis; hyphal anastomosis
Alphapartitivirus		None			Cytoplasm	Cytoplasm	Cell division
Deltapartitivirus	Plants	None	Viral movement; mechanical inoculation	Cell division	Cytoplasm	Cytoplasm	Cell division
Betapartitivirus		None			Cytoplasm	Cytoplasm	Cell division
Gammapartitivirus	Fungi	None	Cytoplasmic exchange; hyphal anastomosis	Cytoplasmic exchange; hyphal anastomosis	Cytoplasm	Cytoplasm	Cytoplasmic exchange; hyphal anastomosis

== Phylogenetics ==
Based on the RNA polymerase gene this group can be divided into four clades (I-IV). Four isolates from animals and protozoans form a fifth clade. Clades I–IV consist of mixtures of partitivirus-like sequences from plants and fungi.

== Taxonomy ==
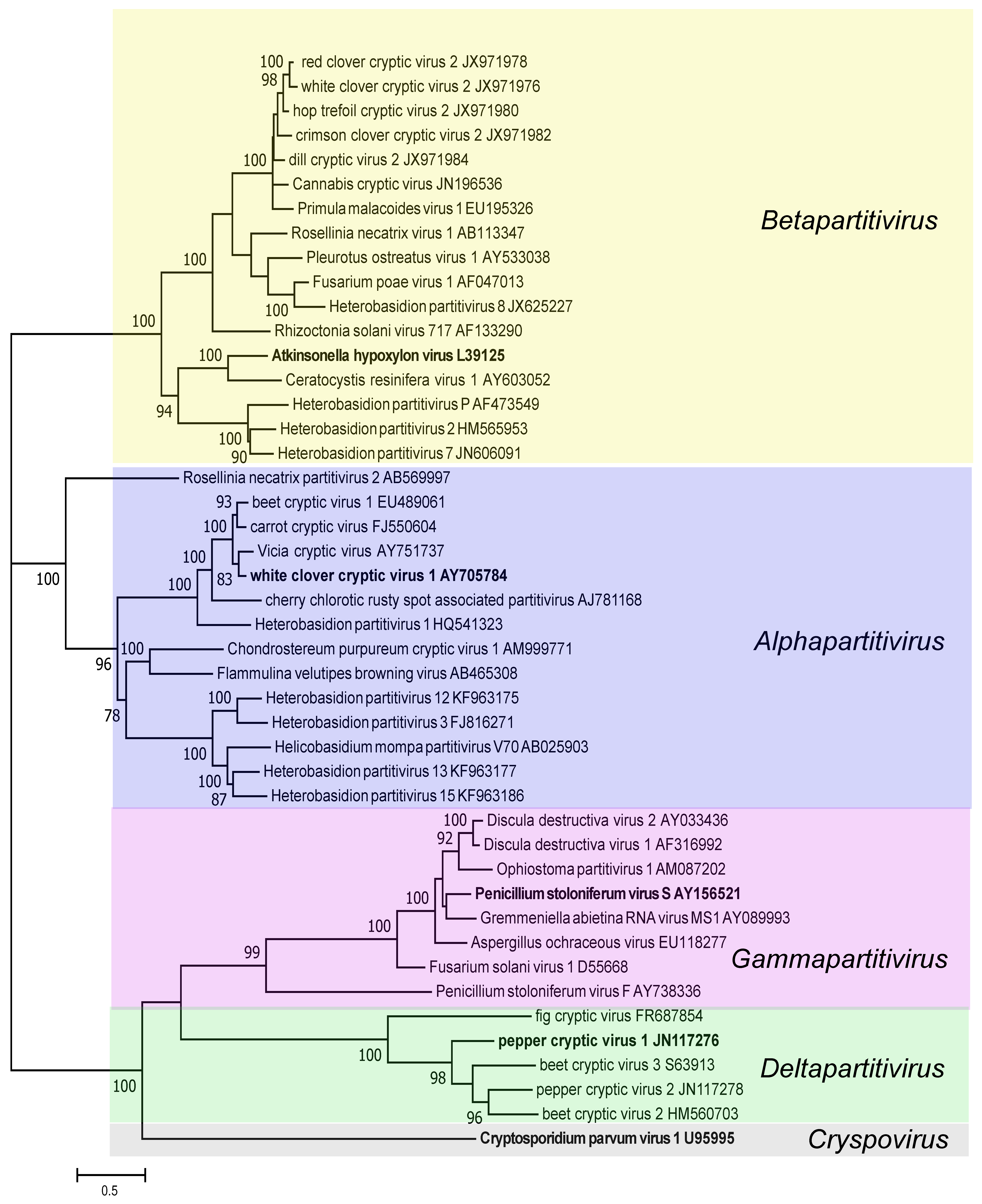
Phylogenetic tree of Partitiviridae

The family contains the following genera:

- Alphapartitivirus
- Betapartitivirus
- Cryspovirus
- Deltapartitivirus
- Gammapartitivirus
