= Durnavirales =

Virus classification
- (unranked): Virus
- Realm: Riboviria
- Kingdom: Orthornavirae
- Phylum: Pisuviricota
- Class: Duplopiviricetes
- Order: Durnavirales

Order of viruses

Durnavirales is an order of double-stranded RNA viruses which infect eukaryotes. The name of the group derives from Italian duplo which means double (a reference to double-stranded), rna for the type of virus, and -virales which is the suffix for a virus order.

== Families ==
The order contains the follow families:

- Amalgaviridae
- Curvulaviridae
- Fusariviridae
- Hypoviridae
- Partitiviridae
- Picobirnaviridae
- Soropartitiviridae
