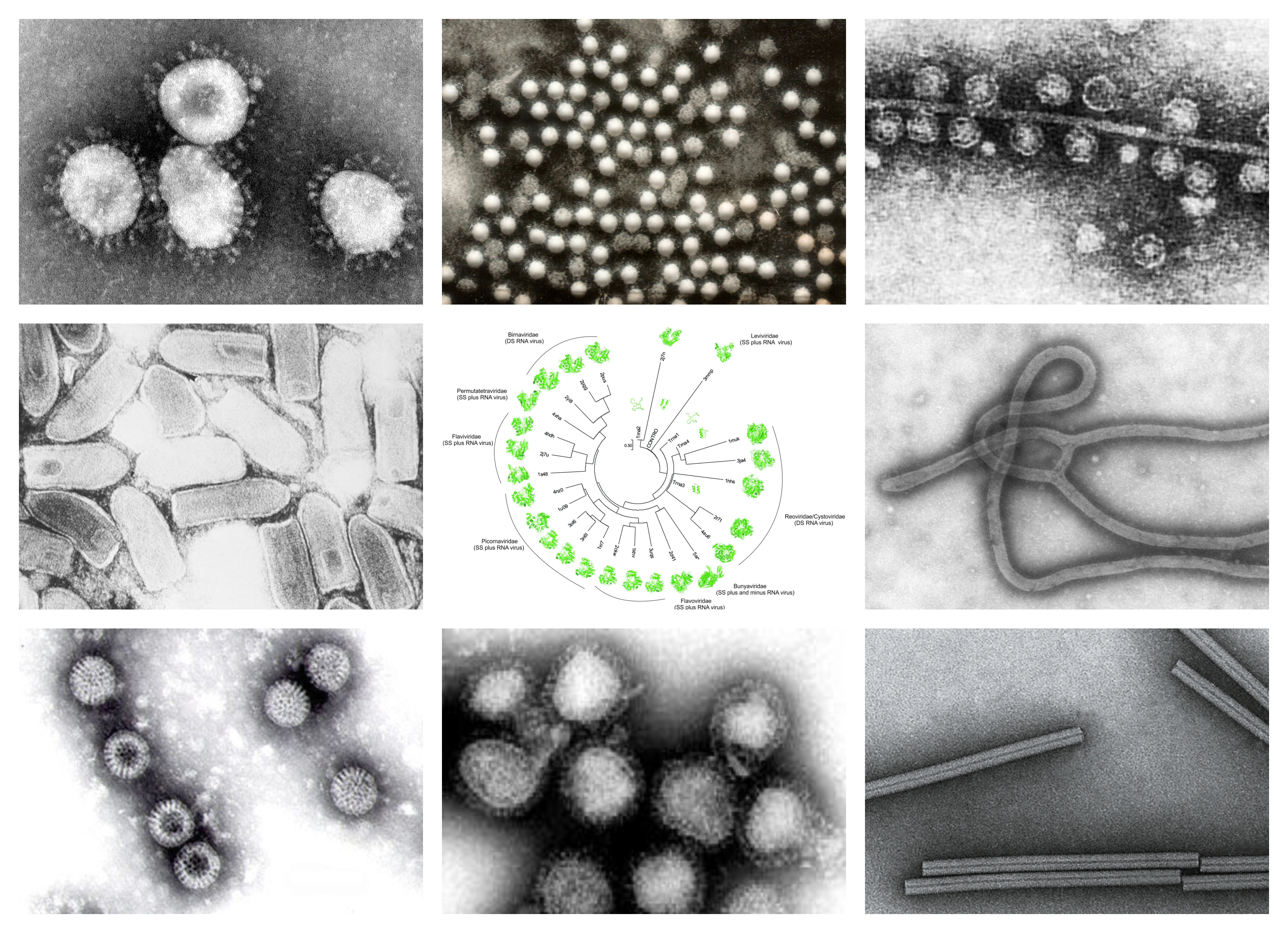
- Clockwise from top left: TEM of avian coronavirus, polio virus, bacteriophage Qβ, ebolavirus, tobacco mosaic virus, influenzavirus A, rotavirus, vesicular stomatitis virus. Center: phylogenetic tree of shared replication protein RdRp.

Virus classification
- (unranked): Virus
- Realm: Riboviria
- Kingdom: Orthornavirae

Phyla and classes
- Positive-strand RNA viruses: Lenarviricota; Kitrinoviricota; Pisuviricota; Pisoniviricetes; Stelpaviricetes; Negative-strand RNA viruses: Negarnaviricota; Double-stranded RNA viruses: Artimaviricota; Duplornaviricota; Pisuviricota; Duplopiviricetes; Ambisense RNA viruses: Ambiviricota

= Orthornavirae =

Kingdom of viruses

Orthornavirae is a kingdom of viruses that have genomes made of ribonucleic acid (RNA), including genes which encode an RNA-dependent RNA polymerase (RdRp). The RdRp is used to transcribe the viral RNA genome into messenger RNA (mRNA) and to replicate the genome. Viruses in this kingdom share a number of characteristics which promote rapid evolution, including high rates of genetic mutation, recombination, and reassortment.

Viruses in Orthornavirae belong to the realm Riboviria. They are descended from a common ancestor. The kingdom is subdivided into seven phyla that separate member viruses based on their genome type, host range, and genetic similarity. Viruses with three genome types are included: positive-strand RNA viruses, negative-strand RNA viruses, and double-stranded RNA viruses.

Many of the most widely known viral diseases are caused by members of this kingdom, including coronaviruses, the Ebola virus, influenza viruses, the measles virus, and the rabies virus, as well as the first virus ever discovered, tobacco mosaic virus. In modern history, RdRp-encoding RNA viruses have caused numerous disease outbreaks, and they infect many economically important crops. Most eukaryotic viruses, including most human, animal, and plant viruses, are RdRp-encoding RNA viruses. In contrast, there are relatively few prokaryotic viruses in the kingdom.

== Etymology ==
The first part of Orthornavirae comes from Greek ὀρθός [orthós], meaning straight, the middle part, rna, refers to RNA, and -virae is the suffix used for virus kingdoms.

== Characteristics ==
=== Structure ===
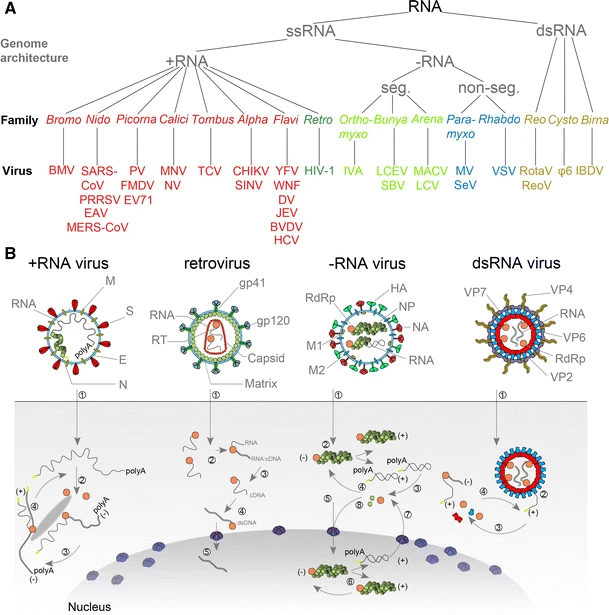
Genome type and replication cycle of different RNA viruses

RNA viruses in Orthornavirae typically do not encode many proteins, but most positive-sense, single-stranded (+ssRNA) viruses and some double-stranded RNA (dsRNA) viruses encode a major capsid protein that has a single jelly roll fold, so named because the folded structure of the protein contains a structure that resembles a jelly roll. Many also possess an envelope, a type of lipid membrane that typically surrounds the capsid. In particular, the viral envelope is near-universal among negative-sense, single-stranded (-ssRNA) viruses.

=== Genome ===
Viruses in Orthornavirae have three different types of genomes: dsRNA, +ssRNA, and -ssRNA. Single-stranded RNA viruses have either a positive or negative sense strand, and dsRNA viruses have both. This structure of the genome is important in terms of transcription to synthesize viral mRNA as well as replication of the genome, both of which are carried out by the viral enzyme RNA-dependent RNA polymerase (RdRp), also called RNA replicase.

=== Replication and transcription ===
==== Positive-strand RNA viruses ====
Positive-strand RNA viruses have genomes that can function as mRNA, so transcription is not necessary. However, +ssRNA will produce dsRNA forms as part of the process of replicating their genomes. From the dsRNA, additional positive strands are synthesized, which may be used as mRNA or for genomes for progeny. Because +ssRNA viruses create intermediate dsRNA forms, they have to avoid the host's immune system in order to replicate. +ssRNA viruses accomplish this by replicating in membrane-associated vesicles that are used as replication factories. For many +ssRNA viruses, subgenomic portions of the genome will be transcribed to translate specific proteins, whereas others will transcribe a polyprotein that is cleaved to produce separate proteins.

==== Negative-strand RNA viruses ====
Negative-strand RNA viruses have genomes that function as templates from which mRNA can be synthesized directly by RdRp. Replication is the same process but executed on the positive sense antigenome, during which RdRp ignores all transcription signals so that a complete -ssRNA genome can be synthesized. -ssRNA viruses vary between those that initiate transcription by the RdRp creating a cap on the 5'-end (pronounced "five prime end") of the genome or by snatching a cap from host mRNA and attaching it to the viral RNA. For many -ssRNA viruses, at the end of transcription, RdRp stutters on a uracil in the genome, synthesizing hundreds of adenines in a row as part of creating a polyadenylated tail for the mRNA. Some -ssRNA viruses are essentially ambisense, and have proteins encoded by both the positive and negative strand, so mRNA is synthesized directly from the genome and from a complementary strand.

==== Double-stranded RNA viruses ====
For dsRNA viruses, RdRp transcribes mRNA by using the negative strand as a template. Positive strands may also be used as templates to synthesize negative strands for the construction of genomic dsRNA. dsRNA is not a molecule produced by cells, so cellular life has evolved mechanisms to detect and inactivate viral dsRNA. To counter this, dsRNA viruses typically retain their genomes inside of viral capsid in order to evade the host's immune system.

=== Evolution ===
RNA viruses in Orthornavirae experience a high rate of genetic mutations because RdRp is prone to making errors in replication since it typically lacks proofreading mechanisms to repair errors. (Note: The exception is that some members of the order Nidovirales encode proofreading exoribonuclease activity as part of a protein that is distinct from RdRp.) Mutations in RNA viruses are often influenced by host factors such as dsRNA-dependent adenosine deaminases, which edit viral genomes by changing adenosines to inosines. Mutations in genes that are essential for replication lead to a reduced number of progeny, so viral genomes typically contain sequences that are highly conserved over time with relatively few mutations.

Many RdRp-encoding RNA viruses also experience a high rate of genetic recombination, though rates of recombination vary significantly, with lower rates in -ssRNA viruses and higher rates in dsRNA and +ssRNA viruses. There are two types of recombination: copy choice recombination and reassortment. Copy choice recombination occurs when the RdRp switches templates during synthesis without releasing the prior, newly created RNA strand, which generates a genome of mixed ancestry. Reassortment, which is restricted to viruses with segmented genomes, has segments from different genomes packaged into a single virion, or virus particle, which also produces hybrid progeny.

For reassortment, some segmented viruses package their genomes into multiple virions, which produces genomes that are random mixtures of parents, whereas for those that are packaged into a single virion, typically individual segments are swapped. Both forms of recombination can only occur if more than one virus is present in a cell, and the more alleles are present, the more likely recombination is to occur. A key difference between copy choice recombination and reassortment is that copy choice recombination can occur anywhere in a genome, whereas reassortment swaps fully-replicated segments. Therefore, copy choice recombination can produce non-functional viral proteins whereas reassortment cannot.

The mutation rate of a virus is associated with the rate of genetic recombinations. Higher mutation rates increase both the number of advantageous and disadvantageous mutations, whereas higher rates of recombination allow for beneficial mutations to be separated from deleterious ones. Therefore, higher rates of mutations and recombinations, up to a certain point, improve viruses' ability to adapt. Notable examples of this include reassortments that enable cross-species transmission of influenza viruses, which have led to numerous pandemics, as well as the emergence of drug-resistance influenza strains via mutations that were reassorted.

== Classification ==
RNA viruses that encode RdRp are assigned to the kingdom Orthornavirae, which contains seven phyla and several taxa that are unassigned to a higher taxa due to lack of information. The phyla are separated based on the genome types, host ranges, and genetic similarity of member viruses.

- Phylum: Ambiviricota, which contains ssRNA viruses that infect fungi. Monopartite circular ambisense genome, with the two conserved non-overlapping ORFs in opposite strandedness. Resembles viroids in predicted secondary structure and ribozyme organization.
- Phylum: Artimaviricota, which contains dsRNA viruses that infect thermoacidophilic bacteria. Bipartite genome.
- Phylum: Duplornaviricota, which contains dsRNA viruses that infect prokaryotes and eukaryotes, which do not cluster with members of Pisuviricota, and which encode a capsid composed of a 60 homo- or heterodimers of capsid proteins organized on a lattice with pseudo T = 2 symmetry
- Phylum: Kitrinoviricota, which contains +ssRNA viruses that infect eukaryotes and which do not cluster with members of Pisuviricota
- Phylum: Lenarviricota, which contains +ssRNA viruses that infect prokaryotes and eukaryotes and which do not cluster with members of Kitrinoviricota
- Phylum: Negarnaviricota, which contains -ssRNA viruses that infect eukaryotes.
- Phylum: Pisuviricota, which contains +ssRNA and dsRNA viruses that infect eukaryotes and which do not cluster with other phyla.

The following taxa in Orthornavirae are not assigned to any higher taxa:

- Class: Orpoviricetes, bisegmented +ssRNA viruses reported from fungi and oomycetes.
- Family: Birnaviridae, dsRNA viruses reported from animals and having a noncanonical RdRp lacking the GDD motif.
- Family: Permutotetraviridae, +ssRNA insect viruses.

The kingdom contains three groups in the Baltimore classification system, which groups viruses together based on their manner of mRNA synthesis, and which is often used alongside standard virus taxonomy, which is based on evolutionary history. Those three groups are Group III: dsRNA viruses, Group IV: +ssRNA viruses, and Group V: -ssRNA viruses.

== Phylogenetics ==
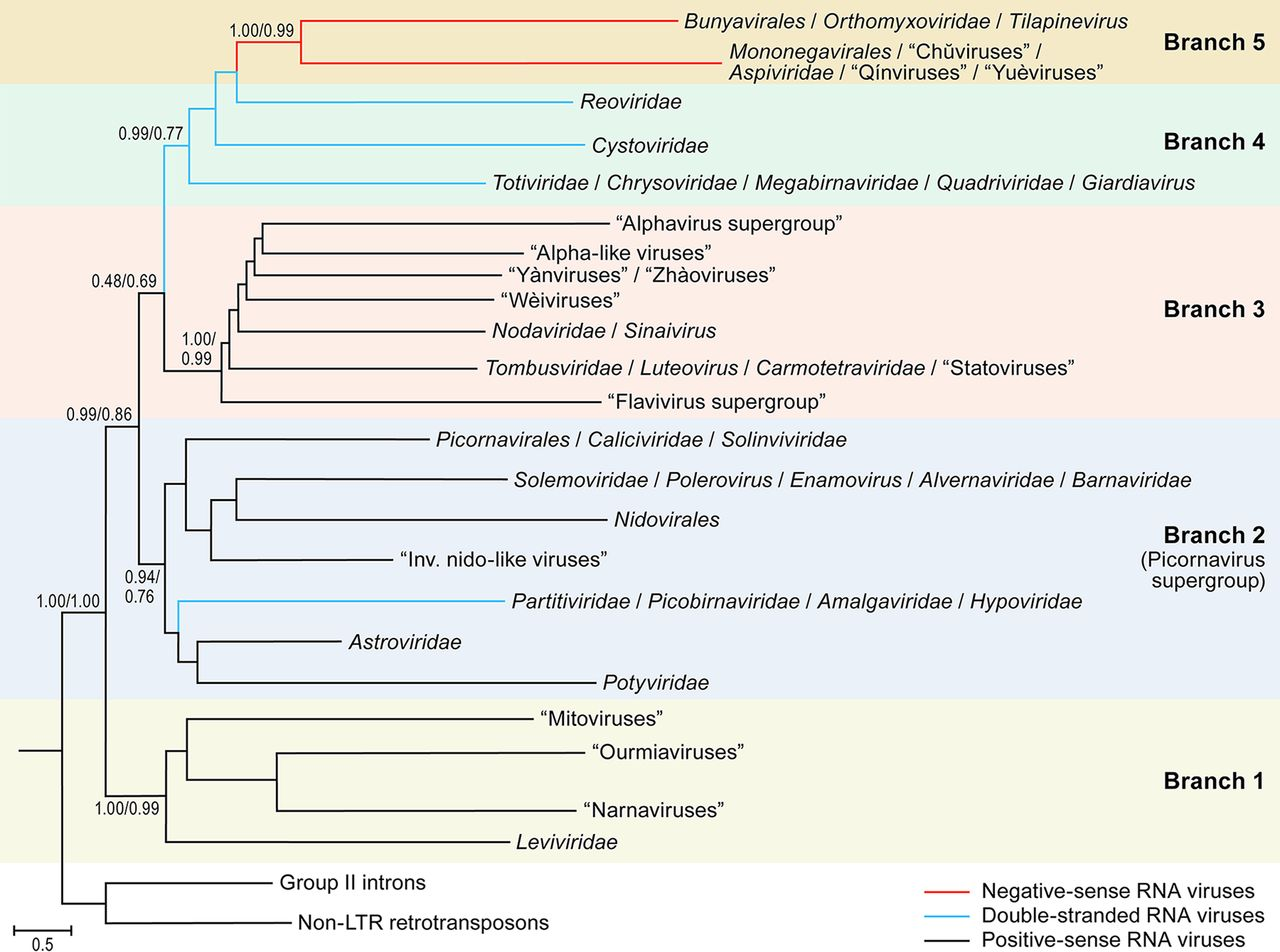
Phylogenetic tree with phylum branches highlighted. Negarnaviricota (brown), Duplornaviricota (green), Kitrinoviricota (pink), Pisuviricota (blue), and Lenarviricota (yellow)

The exact origin of Orthornavirae is not well established, but the viral RdRp shows a relation to the reverse transcriptase (RT) enzymes of group II introns that encode RTs and retrotransposons, the latter of which are self-replicating DNA sequences that integrate themselves into other parts of the same DNA molecule. A 2020 Yangshan Port metagenomic study found that the Birnaviridae and Permutotetraviridae RdRPs fall into Pisuviricota near the Partitiviridae after correcting for domain permutation. This treatment was supported by the presence of alternative permutations in sampled metagenomes belonging to the same branch.

A 2022 Arctic Ocean metatranscriptome study found many new lineages (proposed as phyla). It instead found a topology consistent with RTs being descended from RdRps, being sister to the phylum Lenarviricota. Two of the new phyla ("Taraviricota", "Arctiviricota") branch at very basal locations. The gene content of "Taraviricota", along with its position, suggests that it may represent a form of replicon characteristic of the peptide-RNA world, one that all RNA viruses descended from.

RdRP-based phylogenetic trees
Wolf et al. (2018)

- - RdRPs
    - - - - Negarnaviricota (-)ss
          - Duplornaviricota ds
        - Kitrinoviricota (+)ss
      - Pisuviricota (+)ss, ds
    - Lenarviricota (+)ss
  - RTs
    - Group II intron
    - Non-LTR retrotransposon

Zayed et al. (2022)

- - - - - RTs
        - Lenarviricota (+)ss
      - - - Duplornaviricota: Chrymoviricetes ds
          - Negarnaviricota (-)ss
        - - Kitrinoviricota (+)ss
          - - "Wamoviricota" strandedness not determined
            - "Paraxenoviricota" (+)ss
    - - Pisuviricota (+)ss, ds
      - - Duplornaviricota: Vidavervicetes ds
    - - Duplornaviricota: Resentoviricetes ds
      - "Pomiviricota" (+)ss
  - "Arctiviricota" (-)ss
  - "Taraviricota" ambiguous

Notes:

- Figure 3A presents an unrooted tree. For the figure above, an arbitrary root was chosen using an approximate midpoint. The tree was transcribed in a clockwise direction.
- Duplornaviricota is recovered as polyphyletic.

The Ambiviricota and Artimaviricota are described as having divergent RdRPs, but their position on either tree is unclear. Orpoviricetes is also of uncertain position and with an unusual RdRp.

== Disease ==
RNA viruses are associated with a wide range of disease, including many of the most widely known viral diseases. Notable disease-causing viruses in Orthornavirae include:

- Coronaviruses
- Crimean-Congo hemorrhagic fever virus
- Dengue virus
- Ebolavirus
- Hantaviruses
- Hepatitis A virus
- Hepatitis C virus
- Hepatitis E virus
- Influenza viruses
- Japanese encephalitis virus
- Lassa virus
- Measles virus
- Mumps virus
- Norovirus
- Poliovirus
- Rabies virus
- Respiratory syncytial virus
- Rhinoviruses
- Rift Valley fever virus
- Rotavirus
- Rubella virus
- West Nile virus
- Yellow fever virus
- Zika virus

Animal viruses in Orthornavirae include orbiviruses, which cause various diseases in ruminants and horses, including Bluetongue virus, African horse sickness virus, Equine encephalosis virus, and epizootic hemorrhagic disease virus. The vesicular stomatitis virus causes disease in cattle, horses, and pigs. Bats harbor many viruses including ebolaviruses and henipaviruses, which also can cause disease in humans. Similarly, arthropod viruses in the Flavivirus and Phlebovirus genera are numerous and often transmitted to humans. Coronaviruses and influenza viruses cause disease in various vertebrates, including bats, birds, and pigs.

Plant viruses in the kingdom are numerous and infect many economically important crops. Tomato spotted wilt virus is estimated to cause more than US$1 billion in damages annually, affecting more than 800 plant species including chrysanthemum, lettuce, peanut, pepper, and tomato. Cucumber mosaic virus infects more than 1,200 plant species and likewise causes significant crop losses. Potato virus Y causes significant reductions in yield and quality for pepper, potato, tobacco, and tomato, and Plum pox virus is the most important virus among stone fruit crops. Brome mosaic virus, while not causing significant economic losses, is found throughout much of the world and primarily infects grasses, including cereals.

== History ==
Diseases caused by RNA viruses in Orthornavirae have been known throughout much of history, but their cause was only discovered in modern times. As a whole, RNA viruses were discovered during a time period of major advancements in molecular biology, including the discovery of mRNA as the immediate carrier of genetic information for protein synthesis. Tobacco mosaic virus was discovered in 1898 and was the first virus to be discovered. Viruses in the kingdom that are transmitted by arthropods have been a key target in the development of vector control, which often aims to prevent viral infections. In modern history, numerous disease outbreaks have been caused by RdRp-encoding RNA viruses, including outbreaks caused by coronaviruses, ebola, and influenza.

Orthornavirae was established in 2019 as a kingdom within the realm Riboviria, intended to accommodate all RdRp-encoding RNA viruses. Prior to 2019, Riboviria was established in 2018 and included only RdRp-encoding RNA viruses. In 2019, Riboviria was expanded to also include reverse-transcribing viruses, placed under the kingdom Pararnavirae, so Orthornavirae was established to separate RdRp-encoding RNA viruses from reverse-transcribing viruses.

== Gallery ==
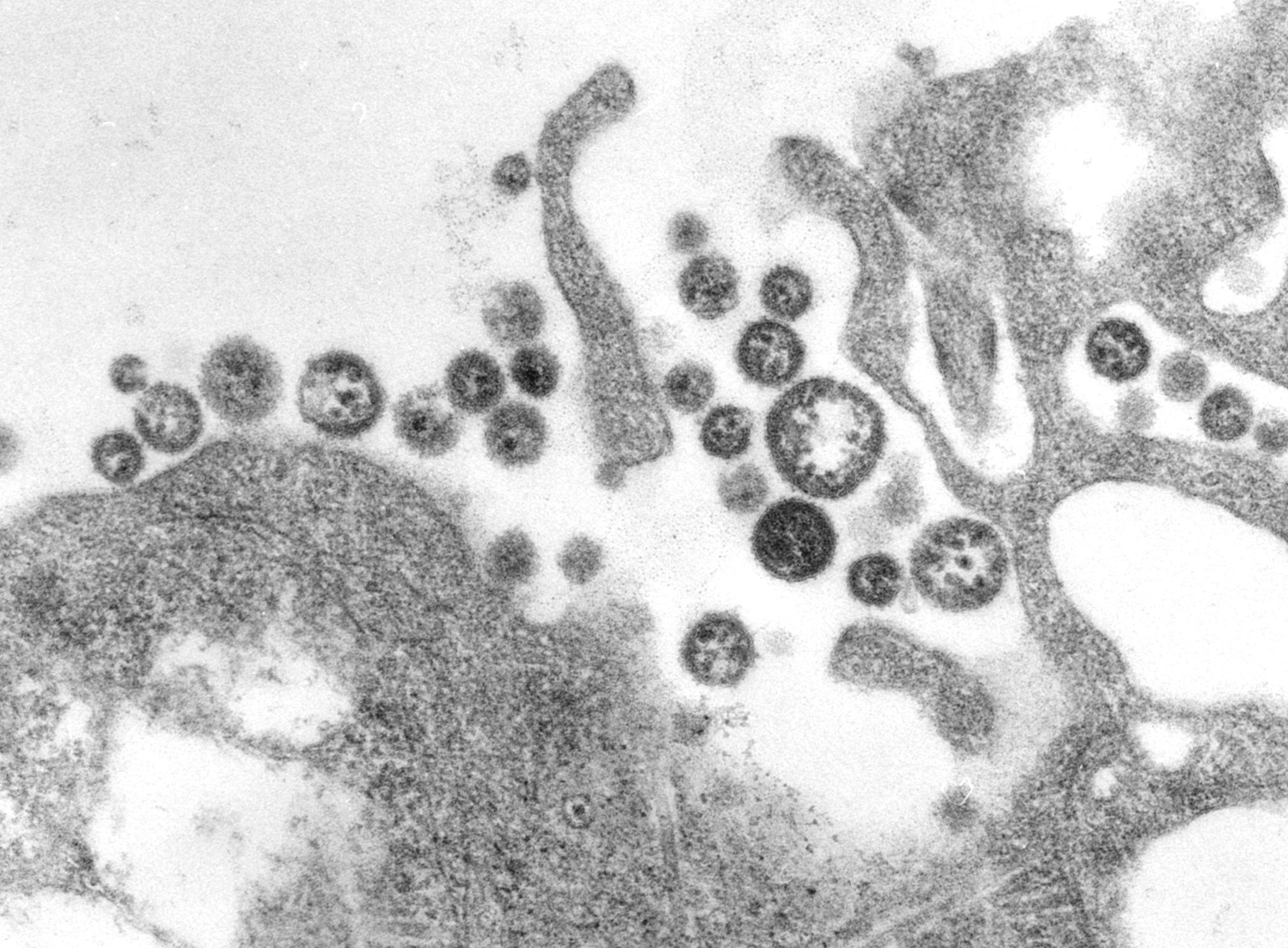
Lassa virus (Arenaviridae)

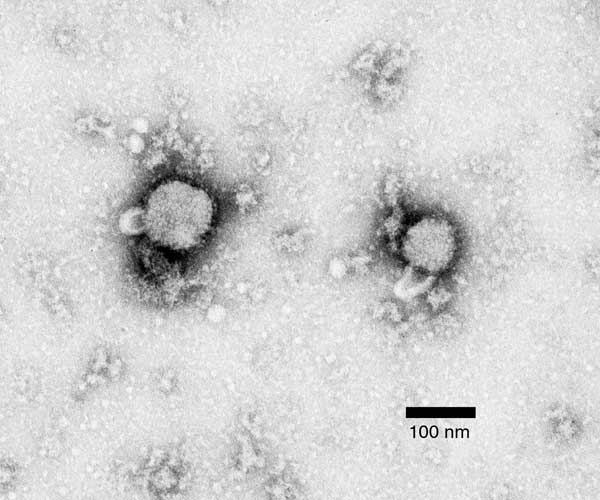
Lymphocytic choriomeningitis virus (Arenaviridae)

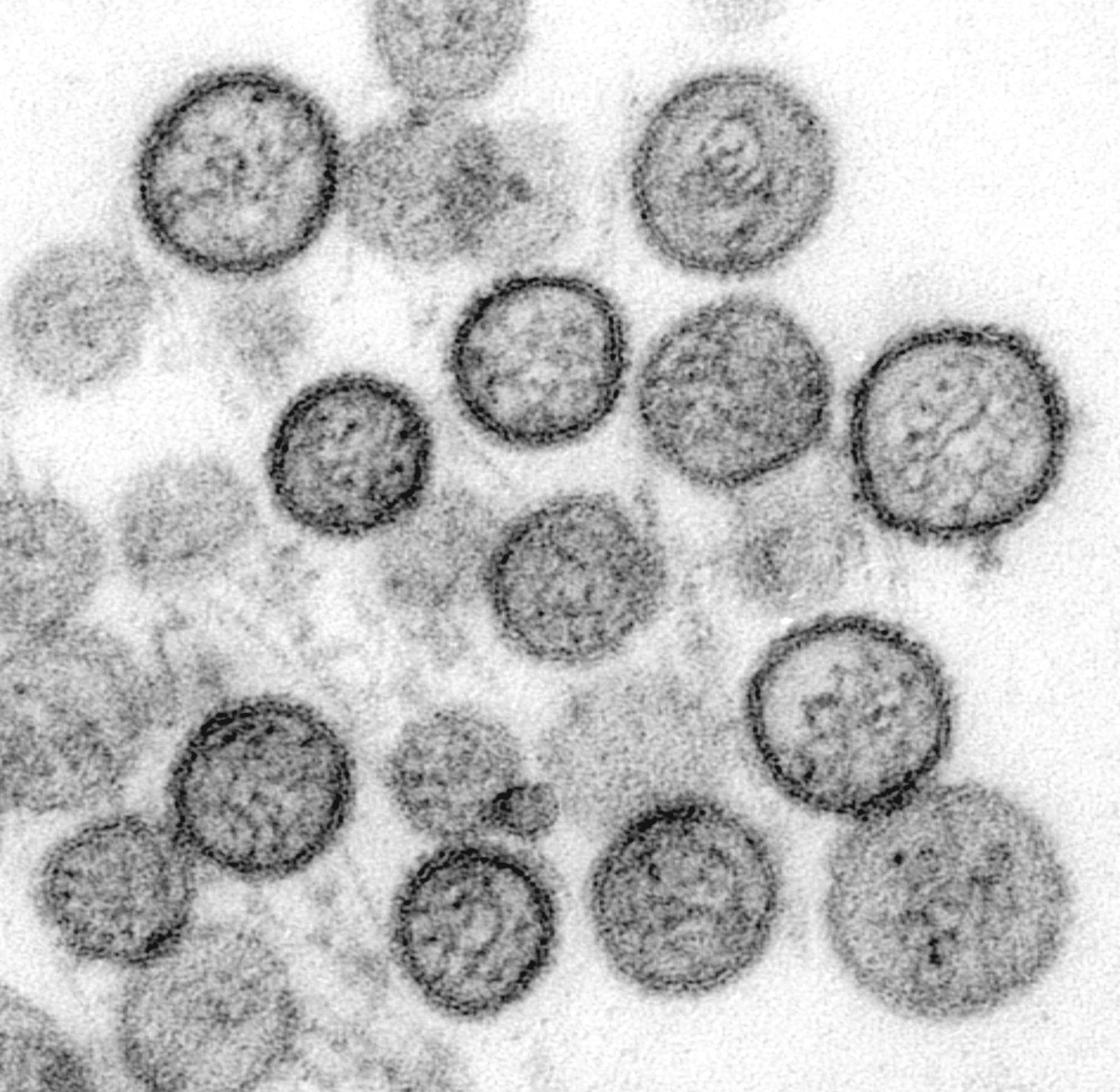
Hantavirus (Hantaviridae)

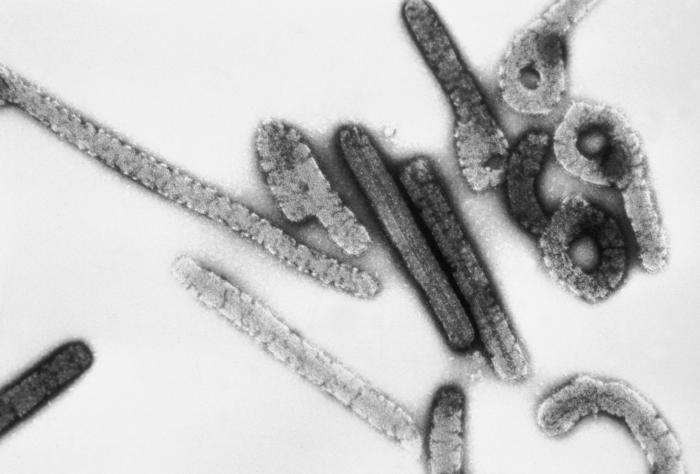
Marburg virus (Filoviridae)

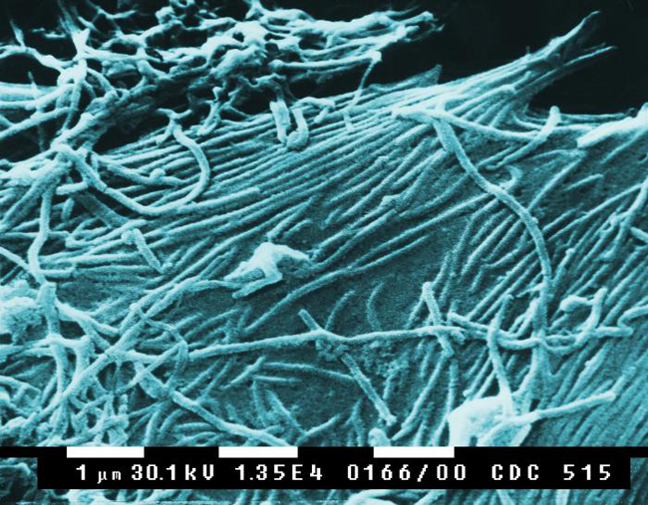
Ebola virus (Filoviridae)

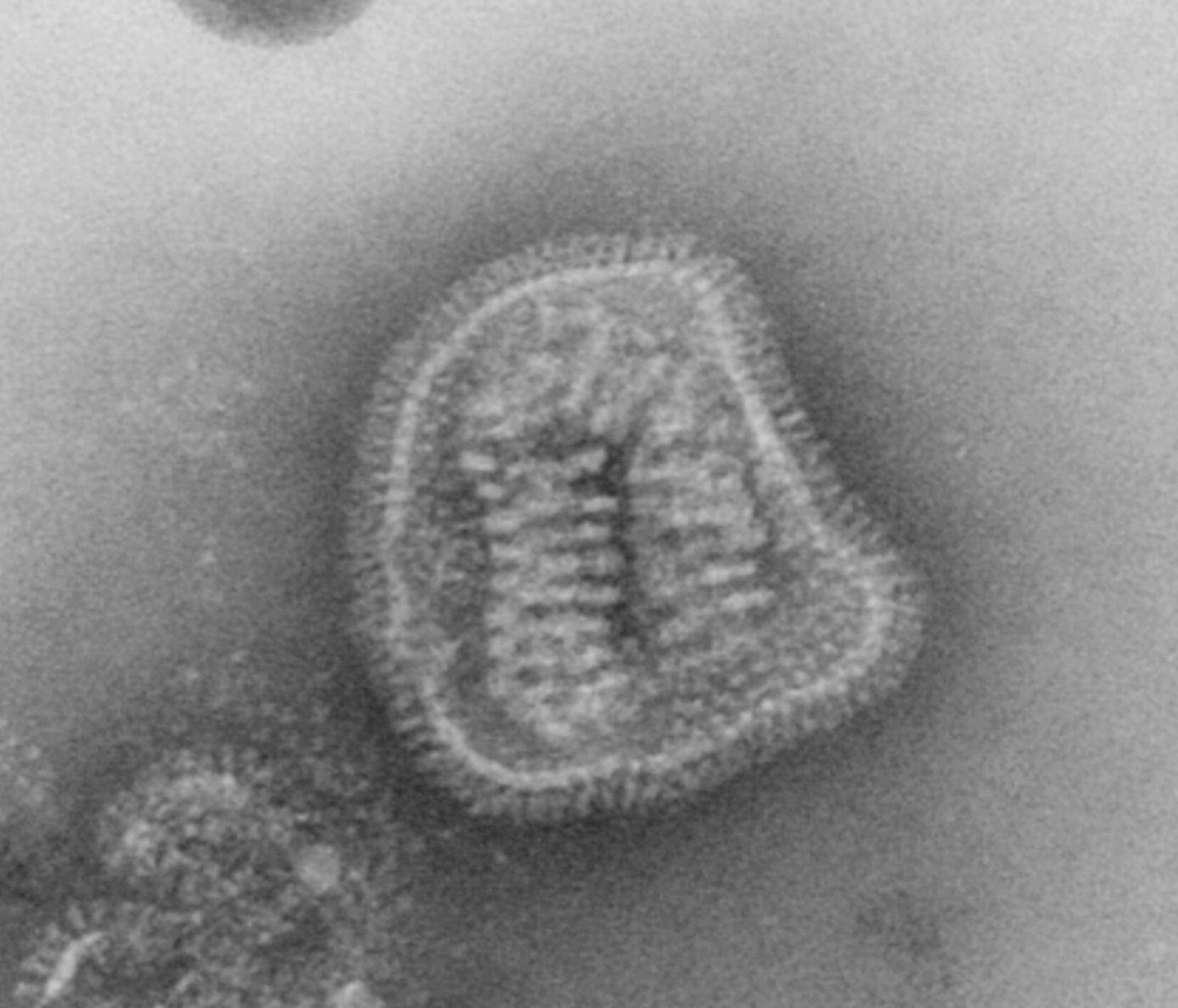
Influenza (Orthomyxoviridae)

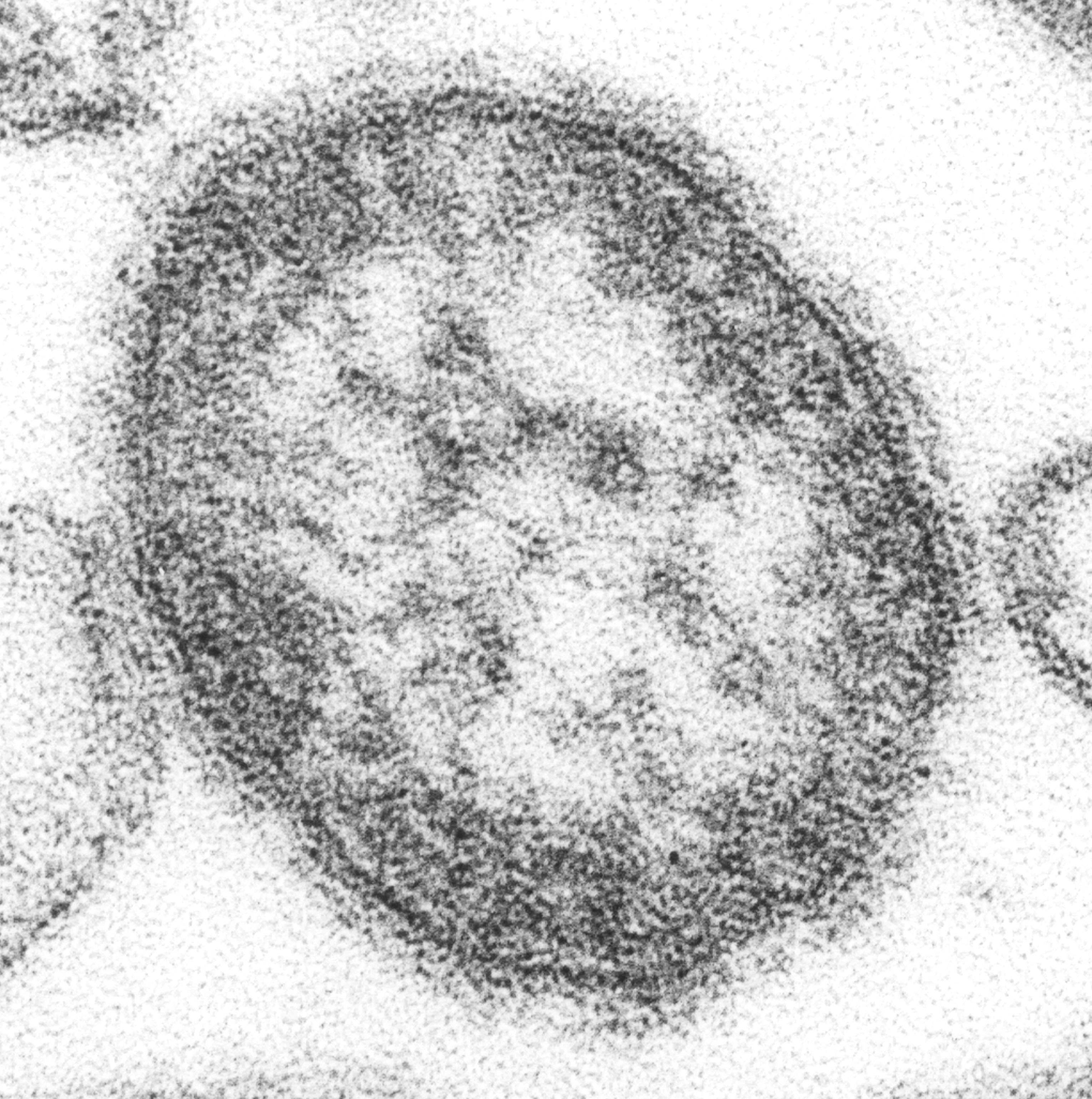
Measles (Paramyxoviridae)

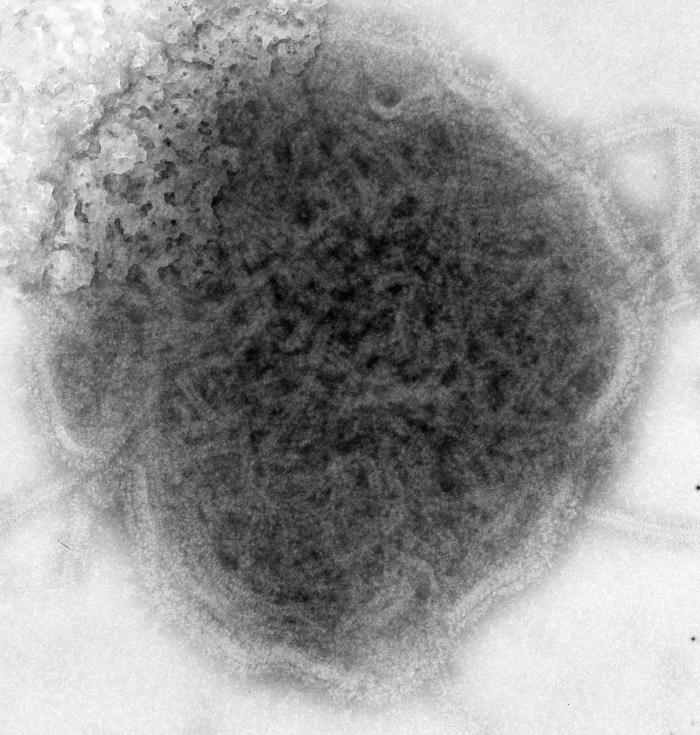
Mumps virus (Paramyxoviridae)

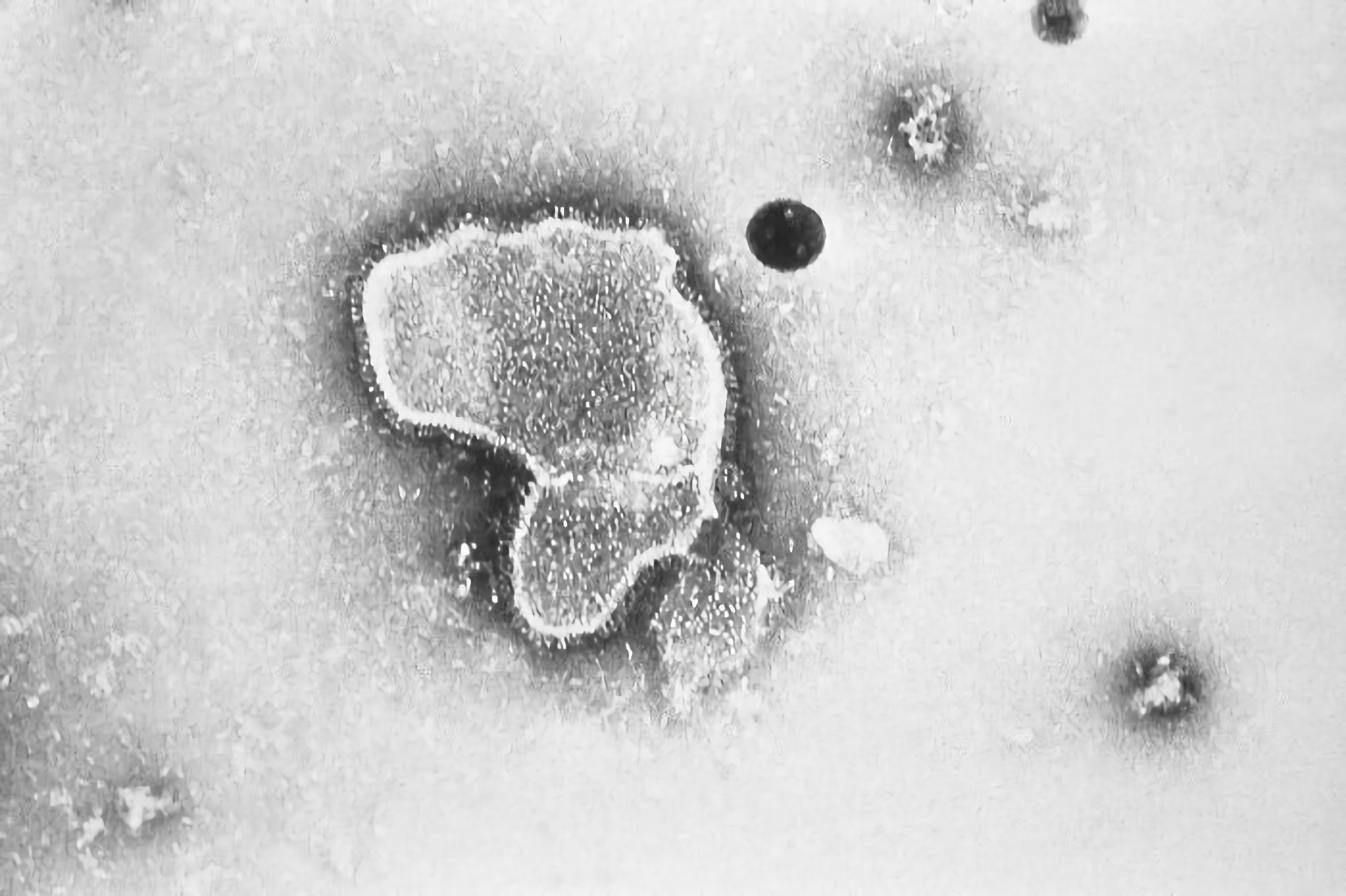
Human respiratory syncytial virus (Paramyxoviridae)

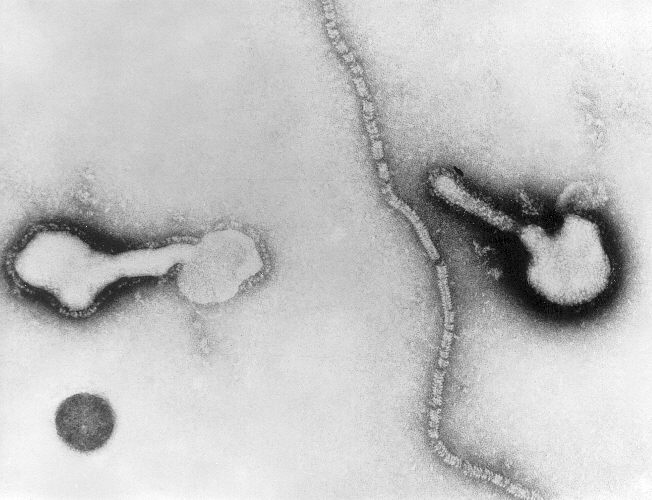
Parainfluenza (Paramyxoviridae)

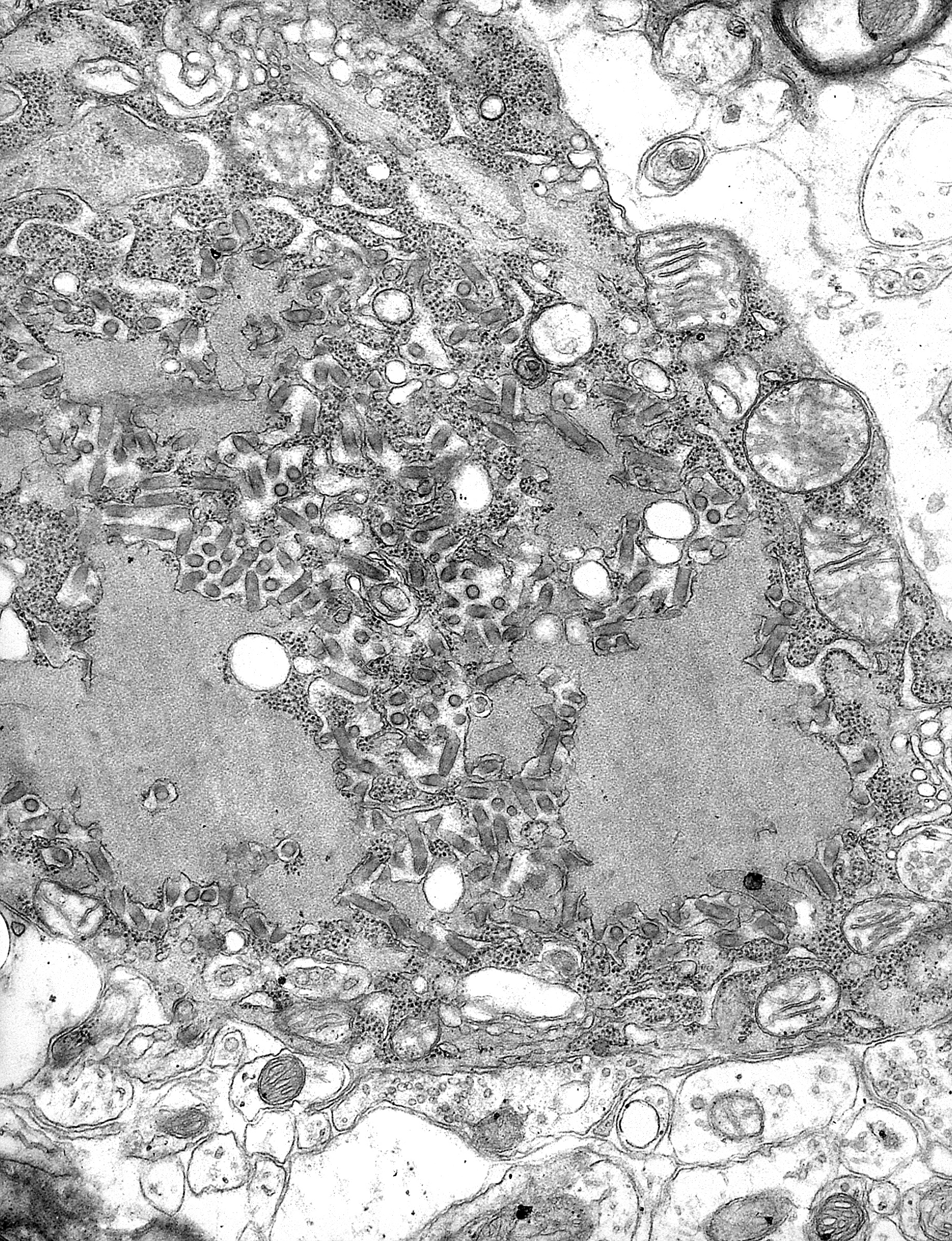
Rabies (Rhabdoviridae)

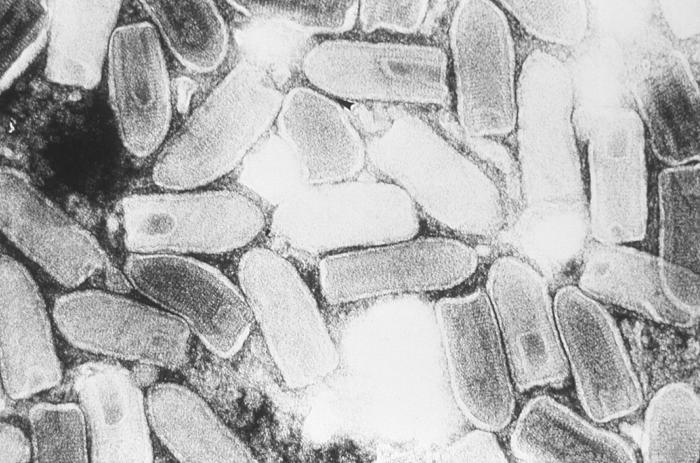
Vesicular stomatitis virus (Rhabdoviridae)
