= List of Culicoides species =

These 1281 species belong to Culicoides, a genus of biting midges in the family Ceratopogonidae.

== Culicoides species ==
=== A ===
- Culicoides abchazicus Dzhafarov, 1964^{c g}
- Culicoides acanthostomus Wirth & Hubert, 1989^{c g}
- Culicoides accraensis Carter, Ingram & Macfie, 1920^{c g}
- Culicoides achkamalicus Dzhafarov, 1964^{c g}
- Culicoides achrayi Kettle & Lawson, 1955^{c g}
- Culicoides acotylus Lutz, 1913^{c g}
- Culicoides actoni Smith, 1929^{c g}
- Culicoides adamskii Wirth, 1990^{c g}
- Culicoides adersi Ingram & Macfie, 1923^{c g}
- Culicoides africanus Clastrier, 1959^{c g}
- Culicoides agas Wirth & Hubert, 1989^{c g}
- Culicoides aitkeni Wirth & Blanton, 1968^{c g}
- Culicoides alachua Jamnback and Wirth, 1963^{i c g}
- Culicoides alahialinus Barbosa, 1952^{c g}
- Culicoides alaskensis Wirth, 1951^{i c g}
- Culicoides alatavicus Gutsevich & Smatov & Isimbekov, 1971^{c g}
- Culicoides alazanicus Dzhafarov, 1961^{c g}
- Culicoides albibasis Wirth & Hubert, 1959^{c g}
- Culicoides albicans (Winnertz, 1852)^{c g}
- Culicoides albifascia Tokunaga, 1937^{c g}
- Culicoides albipennis Kieffer, 1925^{c g}
- Culicoides albofascia Tokunaga, 1937^{g}
- Culicoides albomacula Root & Hoffman, 1937^{c g}
- Culicoides albomotatus Kieffer, 1918^{c g}
- Culicoides albopunctatus Clastrier, 1960^{c g}
- Culicoides albosparsus Kieffer, 1918^{c g}
- Culicoides albovenosus Khamala, 1991^{c g}
- Culicoides alexanderi Wirth and Hubert, 1962^{i c g}
- Culicoides alexandrae Dzhafarov, 1962^{c g}
- Culicoides algecirensis (Strobl, 1900)^{c g}
- Culicoides algeriensis Clastrier, 1957^{c g}
- Culicoides alishanensis Chen, 1988^{g}
- Culicoides alishenensis Chen, 1988^{c g}
- Culicoides allantothecus Wirth & Hubert, 1989^{c g}
- Culicoides almeidae Cambournac, 1970^{c g}
- Culicoides almirantei Wirth & Blanton, 1959^{c g}
- Culicoides alpicola (Strobl, 1910)^{c g}
- Culicoides altaicus Remm, 1972^{c g}
- Culicoides alticola Kieffer, 1913^{c g}
- Culicoides alvarezi Ortiz, 1957^{c g}
- Culicoides amamiensis Tokunaga, 1937^{c g}
- Culicoides amaniensis Khamala, 1991^{c g}
- Culicoides amazonicus Santarem, Felippe-Bauer & Trindade^{g}
- Culicoides amazonius ^{i g}
- Culicoides ameliae Browne, 1980^{c g}
- Culicoides amossovae Remm, 1971^{c g}
- Culicoides anadyriensis Mirzayeva, 1984^{c g}
- Culicoides analis Santos Abreu, 1918^{c g}
- Culicoides andicola Wirth & Lee, 1967^{c g}
- Culicoides andinus Wirth & Lee, 1967^{c g}
- Culicoides andrewsi Causey, 1938^{c g}
- Culicoides angkaensis Kitaoka, Takaoka & Choochote, 2005^{c g}
- Culicoides angolensis Caeiro, 1961^{c g}
- Culicoides annandalei Gangopadhyay & Dasgupta, 2000^{c g}
- Culicoides annettae Spinelli & Borkent, 2004^{c g}
- Culicoides annuliductus Vitale, Wirth & Aitken, 1981^{c g}
- Culicoides anophelis Edwards, 1922^{c g}
- Culicoides antefurcatus Wirth & Blanton, 1959^{c g}
- Culicoides antennalis Lee & Reye, 1953^{c g}
- Culicoides antunesi Forattini, 1954^{c g}
- Culicoides aomoriensis Kitaoka, 1991^{c g}
- Culicoides aquilinus Smatov & Kravets, 1976^{c g}
- Culicoides arabiensis Boorman, 1989^{c g}
- Culicoides aragaoi Tavares & Dias, 1980^{c g}
- Culicoides arakawae (Arakawa, 1910)^{c g}
- Culicoides arakawai (Arakawa, 1910)^{c g}
- Culicoides arboreus Gutsevich, 1952^{c g}
- Culicoides arboricola Root and Hoffman, 1937^{i c g}
- Culicoides archboldi Wirth & Blanton, 1970^{c g}
- Culicoides ardentissimus Tokunaga, 1940^{c g}
- Culicoides ardleyi Tokunaga, 1962^{c g}
- Culicoides arenarius Edwards, 1922^{c g}
- Culicoides arenicola Howarth, 1985^{c g}
- Culicoides aricola Kieffer, 1922^{c g}
- Culicoides arizonensis Wirth and Hubert, 1960^{i c g}
- Culicoides arnaudi Wirth & Hubert, 1961^{c g}
- Culicoides arschanicus Mirzayeva, 1984^{c g}
- Culicoides arubae Fox and Hoffman, 1944^{i c g}
- Culicoides asiatica Bellis^{g}
- Culicoides asiaticus Gutsevich & Smatov, 1966^{c g}
- Culicoides atchleyi Wirth and Blanton, 1969^{i c g}
- Culicoides atelis Wirth, 1982^{c g}
- Culicoides aterinervis Tokunaga, 1937^{c g}
- Culicoides atripennis Shevchenko, 1972^{c g}
- Culicoides aureus Ortiz, 1951^{c g}
- Culicoides austeni Carter, Ingram & Macfie, 1920^{c g}
- Culicoides austini (Carter, Imgram, Macfie)^{i g}
- Culicoides australiensis Kieffer, 1917^{c g}
- Culicoides austropalpalis Lee & Reye, 1955^{c g}
- Culicoides austroparaensis Spinelli, 2005^{c g}
- Culicoides autumnalis Sen & Gupta, 1959^{c g}
- Culicoides avilaensis Ortiz & Mirsa, 1951^{c g}
- Culicoides azerbajdzhanicus Dzhafarov, 1962^{c g}
- Culicoides azureus Wirth & Blanton, 1959^{c g}

=== B ===
- Culicoides bachmanni Spinelli, 2005^{c g}
- Culicoides bahrainensis Boorman, 1989^{c g}
- Culicoides baisasi Wirth & Hubert, 1959^{c g}
- Culicoides bajensis Wirth & Assis de Moraes, 1979^{c g}
- Culicoides bakeri Vargas, 1954^{c g}
- Culicoides balsapambensis Ortiz & Leon, 1954^{c g}
- Culicoides bambusicola Lutz, 1913^{c g}
- Culicoides bancrofti Lee & Reye, 1953^{c g}
- Culicoides baniwa Felippe-Bauer, 2009^{g}
- Culicoides barbosai (Wirth and Blanton)^{i c g}
- Culicoides barnetti Wirth & Hubert, 1959^{c g}
- Culicoides barreti Wirth & Hubert, 1959^{g}
- Culicoides barrosmachadoi Callot, Kremer & Molet, 1967^{c g}
- Culicoides barthi Tavares & Alves de Souza, 1978^{c g}
- Culicoides bassetorum Callot, Kremer & Molet, 1973^{c g}
- Culicoides baueri Hoffman, 1925^{i c g}
- Culicoides bayano Vitale, Wirth & Aitken, 1981^{c g}
- Culicoides beaveri Wirth & Barreto, 1978^{c g}
- Culicoides beckae Wirth and Blanton, 1967^{i c g}
- Culicoides bedfordi Ingram & Macfie, 1923^{c g}
- Culicoides begueti Clastrier, 1957^{c g}
- Culicoides belgicus Kieffer, 1919^{c g}
- Culicoides belkini (Wirth and Arnaud)^{i c g}
- Culicoides benarrochi Ortiz & Mirsa, 1952^{c g}
- Culicoides bergi Cochrane, 1973^{i c g}
- Culicoides bermudensis Williams, 1956^{i c g}
- Culicoides bernardae Itoua & Cornet, 1987^{c g}
- Culicoides beybienkoi Dzhafarov, 1962^{c g}
- Culicoides biarcuatus Vimmer, 1932^{c g}
- Culicoides bickleyi Wirth and Hubert, 1962^{i c g}
- Culicoides biestroi Spinelli, 1991^{c g}
- Culicoides bifasciatus Tokunaga, 1951^{c g}
- Culicoides bigeminus Wirth & Hubert, 1989^{c g}
- Culicoides biguttatus (Coquillett, 1901)^{i c g}
- Culicoides bilobatus Kieffer, 1912^{c g}
- Culicoides bimaculatus Floch & Abonnence, 1942^{c g}
- Culicoides birabeni Cavalieri, 1966^{c g}
- Culicoides biscapus Kieffer, 1925^{c g}
- Culicoides bisignatus Kieffer, 1921^{c g}
- Culicoides bisolis Kremer & Brunhes, 1973^{c g}
- Culicoides blantoni Vargas and Wirth, 1955^{i c g}
- Culicoides bodemensis Clastrier & Delecolle, 1996^{c g}
- Culicoides bodemheimeri Vimmer, 1932^{c g}
- Culicoides bolitinos Meiswinkel, 1989^{c g}
- Culicoides boliviensis Spinelli, 1991^{c g}
- Culicoides boophagus Macfie, 1937^{c g}
- Culicoides boormani Giles & Wirth, 1985^{c g}
- Culicoides borinqueni Fox & Hoffman, 1944^{c g}
- Culicoides bottimeri Wirth, 1955^{i c g}
- Culicoides bougainvillae Tokunaga, 1962^{c g}
- Culicoides boydi Wirth & Mullens, 1992^{c g}
- Culicoides boyi Nielsen & Kristensen, 2015
- Culicoides brasilianus Forattini, 1956^{c g}
- Culicoides bredini Wirth & Blanton, 1970^{c g}
- Culicoides brevifrontis Smatov & Isimbekov, 1971^{c g}
- Culicoides brevipalpis Delfinado, 1961^{c g}
- Culicoides brevitarsis Kieffer, 1917^{c g}
- Culicoides bricenoi Oritz, 1951^{c g}
- Culicoides brinchangensis Wirth & Hubert, 1989^{c g}
- Culicoides bromophilus Kieffer, 1922^{c g}
- Culicoides brookmani Wirth, 1952^{i c g}
- Culicoides brosseti Vattier & Adam, 1966^{c g}
- Culicoides brownei Spinelli, 1993^{c g}
- Culicoides brucei Austen, 1909^{c g}
- Culicoides brunnicans Edwards, 1939^{c g}
- Culicoides bubalus Delfinado, 1961^{c g}
- Culicoides buettikeri Boorman, 1989^{c g}
- Culicoides buhetoensis Takahasi, 1941^{c g}
- Culicoides bulbostylus Khalaf, 1961^{c g}
- Culicoides bundyensis Lee & Reye, 1955^{c g}
- Culicoides bunrooensis Lee & Reye, 1955^{c g}
- Culicoides burylovi Glukhova & Khabirov, 1977^{c g}
- Culicoides butleri Wirth and Hubert, 1960^{i c g}
- Culicoides bwambanus Meillon, 1952^{c g}
- Culicoides bychowskyi Dzhafarov, 1964^{c g}
- Culicoides byersi Atchley, 1967^{i c g}

=== C ===
- Culicoides cacticola Wirth and Hubert, 1960^{i c g}
- Culicoides calcaratus Wirth & Hubert, 1989^{c g}
- Culicoides caldasi Browne, 1980^{c g}
- Culicoides calexicanus Wirth and Rowley, 1971^{i c g}
- Culicoides californiensis Wirth and Blanton, 1967^{i c g}
- Culicoides caliginosus Goetghebuer, 1952^{c g}
- Culicoides calloti Kremer, Delecolle & Bailly-Choumara, 1979^{c g}
- Culicoides cambodiensis Chu, 1986^{c g}
- Culicoides cameronensis Kitaoka, 1983^{c g}
- Culicoides cameroni Campbell & Pelham-Clinton, 1960^{c g}
- Culicoides camicasi Cornet & Chateau, 1971^{c g}
- Culicoides camposi Ortiz & Leon, 1954^{c g}
- Culicoides canadensis Wirth and Blanton, 1969^{i}
- Culicoides cancer Hogue & Wirth, 1968^{c g}
- Culicoides cancrisocius Macfie, 1946^{c g}
- Culicoides capillosus Borkent, 1997^{c g}
- Culicoides capricorniae Dyce & Wirth, 1997^{c g}
- Culicoides caprilesi Fox, 1952^{c g}
- Culicoides caridei (Brethes, 1912)^{c g}
- Culicoides carpenteri Wirth & Blanton, 1953^{c g}
- Culicoides carpophilus Wirth & Hubert, 1989^{c g}
- Culicoides carsiomelas Wirth & Blanton, 1955^{c g}
- Culicoides castillae Fox, 1946^{c g}
- Culicoides cataneii Clastrier, 1957^{c g}
- Culicoides catharinae Kremer, 1991^{c g}
- Culicoides caucaensis Wirth & Lee, 1967^{c g}
- Culicoides caucoliberensis Callot, Kremer & Rioux, 1967^{c g}
- Culicoides causeyi Gangopadhyay & Dasgupta, 2000^{c g}
- Culicoides cavaticus Wirth and Jones, 1956^{i c g}
- Culicoides certus Gupta, 1962^{c g}
- Culicoides ceylanicus Kieffer, 1912^{c g}
- Culicoides chacoensis Spinelli, 1991^{c g}
- Culicoides chagyabensis Lee, 1982^{c g}
- Culicoides changbaiensis Qu & Ye, 1995^{c g}
- Culicoides charadraeus Arnaud, 1956^{c g}
- Culicoides charrua Spinelli, 1991^{c g}
- Culicoides chateaui Cornet, 1970^{c g}
- Culicoides chaverrii Spinelli & Borkent, 2004^{c g}
- Culicoides chazeaui Clastrier & Delecolle, 1996^{c g}
- Culicoides cheahi Kitaoka, 1983^{c g}
- Culicoides chengduensis Zhou & Lee, 1984^{c g}
- Culicoides cheni Kitaoka & Tanaka, 1985^{c g}
- Culicoides chewaclae Glick and Mullen, 1983^{i c g}
- Culicoides chiopterus (Meigen, 1830)^{i c g}
- Culicoides chitinosus Gutsevich & Smatov, 1966^{c g}
- Culicoides choochotei Kitaoka & Takaoka, 2005^{c g}
- Culicoides chrysonotus Wirth & Blanton, 1956^{c g}
- Culicoides ciliodentatus Khamala, 1991^{c g}
- Culicoides cilipes Kieffer, 1921^{c g}
- Culicoides cinereus (Kieffer, 1925)^{c g}
- Culicoides circumbasalis Tokunaga, 1959^{c g}
- Culicoides circumscriptus (Kieffer)^{i c g}
- Culicoides citroneus Carter, Ingram & Macfie, 1920^{c g}
- Culicoides claggi Tokunaga, 1959^{c g}
- Culicoides clarkei Carter, Ingram & Macfie, 1920^{c g}
- Culicoides clastrier Callot, Kremer & Deduit, 1962^{c g}
- Culicoides clastrieri Callot, Kremer & Deduit, 1962^{g}
- Culicoides clavipalpis Mukerji, 1931^{c g}
- Culicoides cleaves Liu, 1995^{c g}
- Culicoides clintoni Boorman, 1984^{c g}
- Culicoides coarctatus Clastrier & Wirth, 1961^{c g}
- Culicoides cochisensis Wirth and Blanton, 1967^{i c g}
- Culicoides cockerellii (Coquillett, 1901)^{i c g}
- Culicoides combinothecus Yu & Li, 1986^{c g}
- Culicoides commatis Wirth & Blanton, 1959^{c g}
- Culicoides comosioculatus Tokunaga, 1956^{c g}
- Culicoides confusus Carter, Ingram & Macfie, 1920^{c g}
- Culicoides congolensis Clastrier, 1960^{c g}
- Culicoides copiosus Root and Hoffman, 1937^{i c g}
- Culicoides coracinus Borkent, 1997^{c g}
- Culicoides cordiformis Kieffer, 1927^{c g}
- Culicoides cordiger Macfie, 1934^{c g}
- Culicoides corneti Kremer, 1972^{c g}
- Culicoides corniculus Liu & Qu, 1981^{c g}
- Culicoides cornutus Meillon, 1937^{c g}
- Culicoides coronalis Lee & Reye, 1955^{c g}
- Culicoides corsicus Kremer, Leberre & Beaucournu-Saguez, 1971^{g}
- Culicoides corsis Kremer, Leberre & Beaucournu-Saguez, 1971^{c g}
- Culicoides corsoni Ingram & Macfie, 1921^{c g}
- Culicoides corti Causey, 1938^{c g}
- Culicoides costalis Tokunaga, 1963^{c g}
- Culicoides coutinhoi Barretto, 1944^{c g}
- Culicoides covagarciai Ortiz, 1950^{c g}
- Culicoides crassipilosus Tokunaga, 1937^{c g}
- Culicoides crassus Tokunaga, 1962^{c g}
- Culicoides crepuscularis Malloch, 1915^{i c g b}
- Culicoides crescentris Wirth & Blanton, 1959^{c g}
- Culicoides crucifer Clastrier, 1968^{c g}
- Culicoides cuiabai Wirth, 1982^{c g}
- Culicoides culiciphagus Wirth & Hubert, 1959^{c g}
- Culicoides cummingi Spinelli & Borkent, 2004^{c g}
- Culicoides cunctans (Winnertz, 1852)^{c g}
- Culicoides cuniculus Lee & Reye, 1953^{c g}
- Culicoides cylindratus Kitaoka, 1980^{c g}

=== D ===
- Culicoides daedaloides Wirth & Blanton, 1959^{c g}
- Culicoides daedalus Macfie, 1948^{i c g}
- Culicoides dalessandroi Wirth & Barreto, 1978^{c g}
- Culicoides damnosus Delfinado, 1961^{c g}
- Culicoides dampfi Root & Hoffman, 1937^{c g}
- Culicoides darlingtonae Wirth & Blanton, 1971^{c g}
- Culicoides dasyophus Macfie, 1940^{c g}
- Culicoides dasyops Clastrier, 1958^{c g}
- Culicoides davidi Spinelli, 1993^{c g}
- Culicoides daviesi Wirth & Blanton, 1968^{c g}
- Culicoides davisi Wirth and Rowley, 1971^{i c g}
- Culicoides deanei Felippe-Bauer & Wirth, 1987^{c g}
- Culicoides debilipalpis Lutz, 1913^{i c g}
- Culicoides decor (Williston, 1896)^{c g}
- Culicoides definitus Sen & Gupta, 1959^{c g}
- Culicoides defoliarti Atchley and Wirth, 1979^{i c g}
- Culicoides dekeyseri Clastrier, 1958^{c g}
- Culicoides delfinadoae Wirth & Hubert, 1989^{c g}
- Culicoides delta Edwards, 1939^{c g}
- Culicoides dendriticus Boorman, 1976^{c g}
- Culicoides dendrophilus Amossova, 1957^{c g}
- Culicoides denisae Clastrier, 1971^{c g}
- Culicoides denisoni Boorman, 1988^{c g}
- Culicoides denningi Foote and Pratt, 1954^{i c g}
- Culicoides dentatus Kieffer, 1921^{c g}
- Culicoides denticulatus Wirth and Hubert, 1962^{i c g}
- Culicoides dentiformis McDonald & Wu, 1972^{g}
- Culicoides derisor Callot & Kremer, 1965^{c g}
- Culicoides desertorum Gutsevich, 1959^{c g}
- Culicoides desytoculus Liu & Zhao, 1998^{c g}
- Culicoides dewulfi Goetghebuer, 1936^{c g}
- Culicoides diabolicus Hoffman, 1925^{c g}
- Culicoides diamouanganai Itoua & Cornet, 1987^{c g}
- Culicoides dicrourus Wirth & Blanton, 1955^{c g}
- Culicoides diffusus Spinelli, 1993^{c g}
- Culicoides digitalis Remm, 1973^{c g}
- Culicoides dikhros Tokunaga, 1962^{c g}
- Culicoides diplus Santarem & Felippe-Bauer^{g}
- Culicoides discrepans Ortiz & Mirsa, 1951^{c g}
- Culicoides dispar Clastrier, 1959^{c g}
- Culicoides dispersus Gutsevich & Smatov, 1966^{c g}
- Culicoides distinctipennis Austen, 1912^{c g}
- Culicoides distinctus Sen & Gupta, 1959^{c g}
- Culicoides diversus Felippe-Bauer, 2003^{c g}
- Culicoides divisus Wirth & Hubert, 1989^{c g}
- Culicoides doeringae Atchley, 1967^{i c g}
- Culicoides dominicanus Wirth & Blanton, 1970^{c g}
- Culicoides donajil Vargas, 1954^{c g}
- Culicoides downesi Wirth and Hubert, 1962^{i c g}
- Culicoides duartei Tavares & Dias, 1980^{c g}
- Culicoides dubiosum Dyce & Wirth, 1997^{c g}
- Culicoides dubitatus Kremer, Rebholtz-Hirtzel & Delecolle, 1976^{c g}
- Culicoides dubius Arnaud, 1956^{c g}
- Culicoides duddingstoni Kettle & Lawson, 1955^{c g}
- Culicoides dukinensis Mirzayeva, 1985^{c g}
- Culicoides dumdumi Sen & Gupta, 1959^{c g}
- Culicoides dungunensis Wirth & Hubert, 1989^{c g}
- Culicoides dunhuaensis Chu, 1983^{c g}
- Culicoides dunni Wirth & Blanton, 1959^{c g}
- Culicoides duodenarius Kieffer, 1921^{c g}
- Culicoides dureti Ronderos & Spinelli, 1995^{c g}
- Culicoides dutoiti Meillon, 1943^{c g}
- Culicoides dycei Lee & Reye, 1953^{c g}
- Culicoides dzhafarovi Remm, 1967^{c g}

=== E ===
- Culicoides eadsi Wirth and Blanton, 1971^{i c g}
- Culicoides edeni Wirth and Blanton, 1974^{i c g}
- Culicoides efferus Fox, 1952^{c g}
- Culicoides effusus Delfinado, 1961^{c g}
- Culicoides elbeli Wirth & Hubert, 1959^{c g}
- Culicoides eldridgei Wirth & Barreto, 1978^{c g}
- Culicoides elemae Pappas & Pappas, 1989^{c g}
- Culicoides elizabethae Dyce & Wirth, 1997^{c g}
- Culicoides elongatus Chu & Liu, 1978^{c g}
- Culicoides elutus Macfie, 1948^{c g}
- Culicoides enderleini Cornet & Brunhes, 1994^{c g}
- Culicoides engubandei Meillon, 1937^{c g}
- Culicoides equatoriensis Barbosa, 1952^{c g}
- Culicoides erairai Kono & Takahasi, 1940^{c g}
- Culicoides erikae Atchley and Wirth, 1979^{i c g}
- Culicoides eriodendroni Carter, Ingram & Macfie, 1920^{c g}
- Culicoides esakii Tokunaga, 1940^{c g}
- Culicoides espinolai Felippe-Bauer & Lourenco-de-Oliveira, 1987^{c g}
- Culicoides estevezae Ronderos & Spinelli, 1994^{c g}
- Culicoides eublepharus Macfie, 1948^{c g}
- Culicoides eupurus Dyce & Wirth, 1997^{c g}
- Culicoides evansi Wirth & Blanton, 1959^{c g}
- Culicoides excavatus Khamala, 1991^{c g}
- Culicoides expalleus Remm, 1973^{c g}
- Culicoides exspectator Clastrier, 1959^{c g}

=== F ===
- Culicoides fadzili Kitaoka, 1983^{c g}
- Culicoides faghihi Naval, 1971^{c g}
- Culicoides fagineus Edwards, 1939^{c g}
- Culicoides farri Wirth & Blanton, 1970^{c g}
- Culicoides fascipennis (Staeger, 1839)^{c g}
- Culicoides felippebauerae Spinelli, 2007^{c g}
- Culicoides fernandezi Ortiz, 1954^{c g}
- Culicoides fernandoi Tavares & Alves de Souza, 1979^{c g}
- Culicoides ferreyrai Ronderos & Spinelli, 1995^{c g}
- Culicoides festivipenis Kieffer, 1914^{c g}
- Culicoides fieldi Wirth & Blanton, 1956^{c g}
- Culicoides filamentis Liu, Ge & Liu, 1996^{c g}
- Culicoides filarifer Hoffman, 1939^{c g}
- Culicoides filariferus Hoffmann, 1939^{g}
- Culicoides filicinus Gornostayeva & Gachegova, 1972^{c g}
- Culicoides filiductus Vitale, Wirth & Aitken, 1981^{c g}
- Culicoides firuzae Dzhafarov, 1958^{c g}
- Culicoides flabitibialis Kitaoka & Tanaka, 1985^{g}
- Culicoides flavescens Macfie, 1937^{c g}
- Culicoides flavidorsalis Tokunaga, 1959^{c g}
- Culicoides flavimaculinotalis Tokunaga, 1940^{c g}
- Culicoides flavipes Vimmer, 1932^{c g}
- Culicoides flavipulicaris Dzhafarov, 1964^{c g}
- Culicoides flavipunctatus Kitaoka, 1975^{g}
- Culicoides flavirostris Vimmer, 1932^{c g}
- Culicoides flaviscriptus Tokunaga, 1959^{c g}
- Culicoides flaviscutatus Wirth & Hubert, 1959^{c g}
- Culicoides flaviscutellaris Wirth & Hubert, 1989^{c g}
- Culicoides flavisomum Mirzayeva, 1984^{c g}
- Culicoides flavitibialis Kitaoka & Tanaka, 1985^{c g}
- Culicoides flavivenula Lima, 1937^{c g}
- Culicoides flavus Gornostayeva, 1980^{c g}
- Culicoides flinti Wirth, 1982^{c g}
- Culicoides flochabonnenci Ortiz & Mirsa, 1952^{c g}
- Culicoides florenciae Messersmith, 1972^{c g}
- Culicoides floridensis Beck, 1951^{i c g}
- Culicoides flukei Jones, 1956^{i c g}
- Culicoides fluminensis Santarem & Felippe-Bauer^{g}
- Culicoides flumineus Macfie, 1937^{c g}
- Culicoides fluvialis Macfie, 1940^{c g}
- Culicoides fluviatilis (Lutz, 1914)^{c g}
- Culicoides foleyi Kieffer, 1922^{c g}
- Culicoides footei Wirth and Jones, 1956^{i c g}
- Culicoides forattinii Ortiz, 1961^{c g}
- Culicoides fordae Wirth & Hubert, 1989^{c g}
- Culicoides fossicola Kieffer, 1922^{c g}
- Culicoides foxi Ortiz, 1950^{c g}
- Culicoides fragmentum Tokunaga, 1962^{c g}
- Culicoides franclemonti Cochrane, 1974^{i c g}
- Culicoides franklini Spinelli, 1993^{c g}
- Culicoides freeborni Wirth and Blanton, 1969^{i c g}
- Culicoides frohnei Wirth and Blanton, 1969^{i c g}
- Culicoides fukienensis Chen & Tsai, 1962^{c g}
- Culicoides fukudai Wada, 1990^{c g}
- Culicoides fulbrighti Lee & Reye, 1963^{c g}
- Culicoides fulvithorax (Austen, 1912)^{c g}
- Culicoides fulvus Sen & Gupta, 1959^{c g}
- Culicoides furcillatus Callot, Kremer & Paradis, 1962^{c g}
- Culicoides furens (Poey)^{i c g}
- Culicoides furensoides Williams, 1955^{c g}
- Culicoides fuscicaudae Macfie, 1947^{c g}
- Culicoides fuscus Goetghebuer, 1952^{c g}
- Culicoides fusipalpis Wirth & Blanton, 1973^{g}

=== G ===
- Culicoides gabaldoni Ortiz, 1954^{c g}
- Culicoides galindoi Wirth & Blanton, 1953^{c g}
- Culicoides galliardi Callot, Kremer & Molet, 1973^{c g}
- Culicoides gambiae Clastrier & Wirth, 1961^{c g}
- Culicoides garciai Wirth & Hubert, 1989^{c g}
- Culicoides gejgelensis Dzhafarov, 1964^{c g}
- Culicoides gemellus Macfie, 1934^{c g}
- Culicoides geminus Macfie, 1937^{c g}
- Culicoides gentilis Macfie, 1934^{c g}
- Culicoides gentiloides Kitaoka & Tanaka, 1985^{c g}
- Culicoides geocheloneoides Dyce & Meiswinkel, 1995^{c g}
- Culicoides germanus Macfie, 1940^{c g}
- Culicoides gewertzi Causey, 1938^{c g}
- Culicoides giganteus Khamala, 1991^{c g}
- Culicoides gigas Root & Hoffman, 1937^{c g}
- Culicoides ginesi Ortiz, 1951^{c g}
- Culicoides glabellus Wirth & Blanton, 1956^{c g}
- Culicoides glabrior Macfie, 1940^{c g}
- Culicoides gladysae Kettle, Elson & Dyce, 1976^{c g}
- Culicoides gluchovae Mirzayeva, 1974^{c g}
- Culicoides glushchenkoae Glukhova, 1989^{c g}
- Culicoides gorgasi Wirth & Blanton, 1953^{c g}
- Culicoides gornostaevae Mirzayeva, 1984^{c g}
- Culicoides gouldi Wirth & Hubert, 1989^{c g}
- Culicoides gracilipes Vaillant, 1954^{c g}
- Culicoides grahamii Austen, 1909^{c g}
- Culicoides grandensis Grogan & Philips, 2008^{c g}
- Culicoides gregsoni Wirth and Blanton, 1969^{i c g}
- Culicoides grenieri Vattier & Adam, 1966^{c g}
- Culicoides griffithi Wirth & Hubert, 1989^{c g}
- Culicoides griseidorsum Kieffer, 1918^{c g}
- Culicoides griseolus (Zetterstedt, 1855)^{c g}
- Culicoides grisescens Edwards, 1939^{c g}
- Culicoides guadeloupensis Floch & Abonnenc, 1950^{c g}
- Culicoides guangxiensis Liu & Hao, 2003^{c g}
- Culicoides guarani Ronderos & Spinelli, 1994^{c g}
- Culicoides guerrai Wirth & Blanton, 1971^{c g}
- Culicoides guineensis Kieffer, 1918^{c g}
- Culicoides gulbenkiani Caeiro, 1959^{c g}
- Culicoides gutsevichi Sen & Gupta, 1958^{c g}
- Culicoides guttatus (Coquillett, 1904)^{c g}
- Culicoides guttifer (de Meijere, 1907)^{c g}
- Culicoides guttipennis (Coquillett, 1901)^{i c g}
- Culicoides guyanensis Floch & Abonnenc, 1942^{i c g}
- Culicoides gymnopterus Edwards, 1926^{c g}

=== H ===
- Culicoides haematopotus Malloch, 1915^{i c g}
- Culicoides hainanensis Lee, 1975^{g}
- Culicoides haitiensis Delecolle, Raccurt & Rebholtz, 1981^{c g}
- Culicoides halonostictus Wirth & Hubert, 1989^{c g}
- Culicoides halophilus (Kieffer)^{i}
- Culicoides hamiensis Chu, Qian & Ma, 1982^{c g}
- Culicoides hanae Braverman, Delecolle & Kremer, 1983^{c g}
- Culicoides haranti Rioux, Descous & Peach, 1959^{c g}
- Culicoides hasegawai Kanasugi & Kitaoka, 2001^{c g}
- Culicoides hawsi Wirth and Rowley, 1971^{i c g}
- Culicoides hayakawai Kitaoka, 1984^{c g}
- Culicoides hayesi Matta, 1967^{c g}
- Culicoides hegneri Causey, 1938^{c g}
- Culicoides heliconiae Fox & Hoffman, 1944^{c g}
- Culicoides heliophilus Edwards, 1921^{c g}
- Culicoides helveticus Callot, Kremer & Deduit, 1962^{c g}
- Culicoides hengduanshanensis Lee, 1984^{c g}
- Culicoides henryi Lee & Reye, 1963^{c g}
- Culicoides herero (Enderlein, 1908)^{c g}
- Culicoides hermani Spinelli & Borkent, 2004^{c g}
- Culicoides heteroclitus Kremer & Callot & Kremer, 1965^{c g}
- Culicoides hewitti Causey, 1938^{c g}
- Culicoides hieroglyphicus Malloch, 1915^{i c g}
- Culicoides hildae Cornet & Nevill, 1979^{c g}
- Culicoides hildebrandoi Latreille, 1809^{g}
- Culicoides himalayae Kieffer, 1911^{c g}
- Culicoides hinmani Khalaf, 1952^{i c g}
- Culicoides hinnoi Howarth, 1985^{c g}
- Culicoides hirstus Khamala, 1991^{c g}
- Culicoides hirsutus (Khamala & Kettle, 1971)^{c g}
- Culicoides hirtipennis Delfinado, 1961^{c g}
- Culicoides hirtulus (Coquillett, 1900)^{i c g}
- Culicoides histrio Johannsen, 1946^{c g}
- Culicoides hitchcocki Spinelli, 1991^{c g}
- Culicoides hoffmani Fox, 1946^{c g}
- Culicoides hoffmanioides Wirth & Hubert, 1989^{c g}
- Culicoides hoguei Wirth and Moraes, 1979^{i c g}
- Culicoides hokkaidoensis Kitaoka, 1984^{c g}
- Culicoides holcus Lee, 1980^{c g}
- Culicoides hollandiensis Tokunaga, 1959^{c g}
- Culicoides hollensis (Melander and Brues, 1903)^{i c g}
- Culicoides homochorus Remm & Zhogolev, 1968^{c g}
- Culicoides homochrous Remm, 1968^{g}
- Culicoides homotomus Kieffer, 1921^{c g}
- Culicoides hondurensis Spinelli & Borkent, 2004^{c g}
- Culicoides hornsbyensis Lee & Reye, 1963^{c g}
- Culicoides hortensis Khamala, 1991^{c g}
- Culicoides horticola Lutz, 1913^{c g}
- Culicoides huambensis (Caeiro, 1961)^{c g}
- Culicoides huayingensis Zhou & Lee, 1984^{c g}
- Culicoides huberti Howarth, 1985^{c g}
- Culicoides huffi Causey, 1938^{c g}
- Culicoides hui Wirth & Hubert, 1961^{c g}
- Culicoides hulinensis Liu & Yu, 1996^{c g}
- Culicoides humeralis Okada, 1941^{c g}
- Culicoides husseyi Wirth and Blanton, 1971^{i c g}
- Culicoides hyalinus Tokunaga, 1962^{c g}
- Culicoides hylas Macfie, 1940^{c g}
- Culicoides hypsipyles (Meillon, 1936)^{c g}

=== I-J ===
- Culicoides ibericus Dzhafarov, 1964^{c g}
- Culicoides ibriensis Boorman, 1989^{c g}
- Culicoides ichesi Ronderos & Spinelli, 1995^{c g}
- Culicoides ignacioi Forattini, 1957^{c g}
- Culicoides iliensis Gutsevich & Smatov, 1966^{c g}
- Culicoides imicola (Kieffer, 1913)^{c g}
- Culicoides imitador Ortiz, 1953^{c g}
- Culicoides immaculatus Lee & Reye, 1953^{c g}
- Culicoides imperceptus Gupta, 1962^{c g}
- Culicoides impunctatus Goetghebuer, 1920^{c g}
- Culicoides impusilloides Spinelli, 1991^{c g}
- Culicoides indecorus Kieffer, 1912^{c g}
- Culicoides indianus Macfie, 1932^{c g}
- Culicoides inexploratus Sen & Gupta, 1959^{c g}
- Culicoides inflatipalpalis Tokunaga, 1963^{c g}
- Culicoides infulatus Delfinado, 1961^{c g}
- Culicoides ingignipennis Macfie, 1937^{g}
- Culicoides innoxius Sen & Gupta, 1959^{c g}
- Culicoides inornatipennis (Carter, Ingram & Macfie, 1920)^{c g}
- Culicoides inornatithorax Gupta, 1963^{c g}
- Culicoides insignipennis Macfie, 1937^{c g}
- Culicoides insignis Lutz, 1913^{i c g}
- Culicoides insinuatus Ortiz & Leon, 1954^{c g}
- Culicoides insolatus Wirth and Hubert, 1960^{i c g}
- Culicoides insulanus Macfie, 1933^{c g}
- Culicoides insularis Kitaoka, 1980^{c g}
- Culicoides interrogatus Lee & Reye, 1963^{c g}
- Culicoides inthanonensis Kitaoka, Takaoka & Choochote, 2005^{c g}
- Culicoides inyoensis Wirth and Blanton, 1969^{i c g}
- Culicoides iphthimus Zhou & Lee, 1984^{c g}
- Culicoides iranicus Naval, 1971^{c g}
- Culicoides iriartei Fox, 1952^{c g}
- Culicoides irregularis Santarem, Felippe-Bauer & Castellon^{g}
- Culicoides irwini Spinelli, 1991^{c g}
- Culicoides isechnoensis Glick, 1990^{c g}
- Culicoides isioloensis (Cornet, Nevill & Walker, 1974)^{c g}
- Culicoides jacksoni Atchley, 1970^{i c g}
- Culicoides jacobsoni Macfie, 1934^{c g}
- Culicoides jamaicensis Edwards, 1922^{i c g}
- Culicoides jamesi Fox, 1946^{i c g}
- Culicoides jamnbacki Wirth and Hubert, 1962^{i c g}
- Culicoides japonicus Arnaud, 1956^{c g}
- Culicoides javae Tokunaga, 1951^{c g}
- Culicoides javanicus Salm, 1918^{c g}
- Culicoides jefferyi Kitaoka, 1983^{c g}
- Culicoides jianfenglingensis Liu, 1995^{c g}
- Culicoides jimmiensis Tokunaga, 1959^{c g}
- Culicoides jonesi Wirth and Hubert, 1960^{i c g}
- Culicoides jouberti (Huttel, Huttel, & Verdier, 1953)^{c g}
- Culicoides juddi Cochrane, 1973^{i c g}
- Culicoides jumineri Callot & Kremer, 1970^{c g}
- Culicoides jurbergi Felippe-Bauer, 2005^{c g}
- Culicoides jurensis Callot, Kremer & Deduit, 1962^{c g}

=== K ===
- Culicoides kaimosiensis Khamala, 1991^{c g}
- Culicoides kalix Nielsen & Kristensen, 2015
- Culicoides kampa Felippe-Bauer, Veras, Castellon & Moreira, 2000^{c g}
- Culicoides kamrupi Sen & Gupta, 1959^{c g}
- Culicoides kanagai Khamala, 1991^{c g}
- Culicoides karagiensis Smatov & Aldabergenov, 1973^{c g}
- Culicoides karajevi Dzhafarov, 1961^{c g}
- Culicoides karakumensis Gutsevich & Molotova, 1973^{c g}
- Culicoides karenensis Glick, 1990^{c g}
- Culicoides kasimi Kasimi, 1961^{c g}
- Culicoides kelantanensis Wirth & Hubert, 1989^{c g}
- Culicoides kelinensis Lee, 1979^{c g}
- Culicoides kepongensis Wirth & Hubert, 1989^{c g}
- Culicoides kerichoensis Khamala, 1991^{c g}
- Culicoides kettlei Breidenbaugh & Mullens, 1999^{c g}
- Culicoides kibatiensis (Goetghebuer, 1935)^{c}
- Culicoides kibunensis Tokunaga, 1937^{i c g}
- Culicoides kinabaluensis Wirth & Hubert, 1989^{c g}
- Culicoides kinari Howarth, 1985^{c g}
- Culicoides kingi (Austen, 1912)^{c g}
- Culicoides kirbyi Glick and Mullen, 1983^{i c g}
- Culicoides kirgizicus Glukhova, 1973^{c g}
- Culicoides kirinensis Lee, 1976^{c g}
- Culicoides kisangkini Howarth, 1985^{c g}
- Culicoides klossi Edwards, 1933^{c g}
- Culicoides knowltoni Beck, 1956^{i c g}
- Culicoides kobae (Cornet & Chateau, 1971)^{c g}
- Culicoides kolymbiensis Boorman, 1988^{c g}
- Culicoides komarovi Mirzayeva, 1985^{c g}
- Culicoides konmiaoensis Liu & Zhou, 2006^{c g}
- Culicoides koreensis Arnaud, 1956^{c g}
- Culicoides korossoensis (Huttel & Huttel, 1952)^{c g}
- Culicoides kotonkan Boorman & Dipeolu, 1979^{c g}
- Culicoides krameri Clastrier, 1959^{c g}
- Culicoides kribiensis Kieffer, 1921^{c g}
- Culicoides krombeini Giles, Wirth & Messersmith, 1981^{c g}
- Culicoides kugitangi Atajev, 1976^{c g}
- Culicoides kumbaensis Callot, Kremer, Mouchet & Bach, 1965^{c g}
- Culicoides kurensis Dzhafarov, 1960^{c g}
- Culicoides kusaiensis Tokunaga, 1940^{c g}
- Culicoides kuscheli Wirth & Blanton, 1978^{c g}
- Culicoides kyotoensis Tokunaga, 1937^{c g}
- Culicoides kyushuensis Wada, 1986^{c g}

=== L ===
- Culicoides lacustris Ronderos, 1991^{c g}
- Culicoides lahillei Iches, 1906^{g}
- Culicoides lahontan Wirth and Blanton, 1969^{i c g}
- Culicoides laimargus Zhou & Lee, 1984^{c g}
- Culicoides lamborni Ingram & Macfie, 1925^{c g}
- Culicoides landauae Kremer, Rebholtz-Hirtzel & Bailly-Choumara, 1975^{c g}
- Culicoides lanei Ortiz, 1950^{c g}
- Culicoides langeroni Kieffer, 1921^{c g}
- Culicoides lansangensis Howarth, 1985^{c g}
- Culicoides lanyuensis Kitaoka & Tanaka, 1985^{c g}
- Culicoides laoensis Howarth, 1985^{c g}
- Culicoides lasaensis Lee, 1979^{c g}
- Culicoides latifrons Khamala, 1991^{c g}
- Culicoides latifrontis Shakirzyanova, 1962^{c g}
- Culicoides latipennis Kieffer, 1919^{c g}
- Culicoides leanderensis Lee & Reye, 1963^{c g}
- Culicoides leechi Wirth, 1977^{i c g}
- Culicoides leei Tokunaga, 1960^{c g}
- Culicoides lenae Gluschenko & Mirzayeva, 1970^{c g}
- Culicoides lenti Tavares & Dias, 1980^{c g}
- Culicoides leoni Barbosa, 1952^{c g}
- Culicoides leopoldoi Ortiz, 1951^{c g}
- Culicoides leucostictus Kieffer, 1911^{c g}
- Culicoides lichyi Floch & Abonnenc, 1949^{c g}
- Culicoides lieni Chen, 1979^{c g}
- Culicoides limai Barretto, 1944^{c g}
- Culicoides limonensis Ortiz & Leon, 1954^{c g}
- Culicoides lini Kitaoka & Tanaka, 1985^{c g}
- Culicoides liubaensis Liu, 2005^{c g}
- Culicoides liui Wirth & Hubert, 1961^{c g}
- Culicoides liukueiensis Kitaoka & Tanaka, 1985^{c g}
- Culicoides lobatoi Felippe-Bauer & Quintelas, 1994^{c g}
- Culicoides loisae Jamnback, 1965^{i c g}
- Culicoides longicercus Kitaoka, 1980^{c g}
- Culicoides longicollis Glukhova, 1971^{c g}
- Culicoides longior Hagan & Reye, 1986^{c g}
- Culicoides longipalpis Delfinado, 1961^{c g}
- Culicoides longipennis Khalaf, 1957^{c g}
- Culicoides longiporus Chu & Liu, 1978^{c g}
- Culicoides longiradialis Tokunaga, 1962^{c g}
- Culicoides longirostris Qu & Wang, 1994^{c g}
- Culicoides lopesi Barretto, 1944^{c g}
- Culicoides lophortygis Atchley and Wirth, 1975^{i c g}
- Culicoides loughnani Edwards, 1922^{i c g}
- Culicoides loxodontis Meiswinkel, 1992^{c g}
- Culicoides luganicus Shevchenko, 1972^{c g}
- Culicoides luglani Jones and Wirth, 1958^{i c g}
- Culicoides luilianchengi Chen, 1988^{g}
- Culicoides lulianchengi Chen, 1988^{c g}
- Culicoides lutealaris Wirth & Blanton, 1956^{c g}
- Culicoides luteolus Wirth & Hubert, 1989^{c g}
- Culicoides luteoventus Root & Hoffman, 1937^{c g}
- Culicoides luteovenus Root & Hoffman^{i g}
- Culicoides lutzi Lima, 1937^{c g}
- Culicoides lyrinotatus Wirth & Blanton, 1955^{c g}

=== M ===
- Culicoides maai Wirth & Hubert, 1989^{c g}
- Culicoides macclurei Wirth & Hubert, 1989^{c g}
- Culicoides macfiei Causey, 1938^{c g}
- Culicoides machardyi (Campbell and Pelham-clinton)^{i}
- Culicoides macieli Tavares & Ruiz, 1980^{c g}
- Culicoides macintoshi Cornet & Nevill, 1980^{c g}
- Culicoides mackerrasi Lee & Reye, 1963^{c g}
- Culicoides macrostigma Wirth & Blanton, 1953^{c g}
- Culicoides maculatus Shiraki, 1913^{c g}
- Culicoides maculipennis (Macfie, 1925)^{c g}
- Culicoides maculiscutellaris Tokunaga, 1959^{c g}
- Culicoides maculitibialis Lien, Weng & Lin, 1997^{c g}
- Culicoides madagascarensis Meillon, 1961^{c g}
- Culicoides magnificus Sen & Gupta, 1959^{c g}
- Culicoides magnipalpis Wirth & Blanton, 1953^{c g}
- Culicoides magnipictus Tokunaga, 1962^{c g}
- Culicoides magnithecalis Gangopadhyay & Dasgupta, 2000^{c g}
- Culicoides magnus Colaco, 1946^{c g}
- Culicoides malariologiensis Perruolo, 1991^{c g}
- Culicoides malayae Macfie, 1937^{c g}
- Culicoides malevillei Kremer & Coluzzi, 1971^{c g}
- Culicoides mamaensis Lee, 1979^{c g}
- Culicoides manchuriensis Tokunaga, 1941^{c g}
- Culicoides manikumari Wirth & Hubert, 1989^{c g}
- Culicoides marcleti Callot, Kremer & Baset, 1968^{c g}
- Culicoides marginalis Chu & Liu, 1978^{c g}
- Culicoides marginatus Delfinado, 1961^{c g}
- Culicoides marginus Chu, 1984^{c g}
- Culicoides margipictus Qu & Wang, 1994^{c g}
- Culicoides marinkellei Wirth & Lee, 1967^{c g}
- Culicoides maritime Kieffer, 1924^{c g}
- Culicoides maritimus (Kieffer)^{i g}
- Culicoides marium (Lutz)^{i g}
- Culicoides marksi Lee & Reye, 1953^{c g}
- Culicoides marmoratus (Skuse, 1889)^{c g}
- Culicoides marshi Wirth & Blanton, 1956^{c g}
- Culicoides martinezi Wirth & Blanton, 1970^{c g}
- Culicoides maruim Lutz, 1913^{c g}
- Culicoides mathisi Giles & Wirth, 1983^{c g}
- Culicoides matsuzawai Tokunaga, 1950^{c g}
- Culicoides mayeri Goetghebuer, 1935^{c g}
- Culicoides mcdonaldi Wirth & Hubert, 1989^{c g}
- Culicoides mcdowelli Delfinado, 1961^{c g}
- Culicoides mckeeveri Brickle & Hagan, 1999^{c g}
- Culicoides mcmillani Lee & Reye, 1953^{c g}
- Culicoides meijerei Kieffer, 1919^{c g}
- Culicoides melanesiae Macfie, 1939^{c g}
- Culicoides melleus (Coquillett, 1901)^{i c g}
- Culicoides mellipes Wirth & Hubert, 1989^{c g}
- Culicoides menghaiensis Lee, 1980^{c g}
- Culicoides menglaensis Chu & Liu, 1978^{c g}
- Culicoides meridionalis Xue, Liu & Yu, 2003^{c g}
- Culicoides mesghalii Naval, 1973^{c g}
- Culicoides metagonatus Wirth & Blanton, 1956^{c g}
- Culicoides micheli Cornet & Chateau, 1971^{c g}
- Culicoides micromaculatus Vimmer, 1932^{c g}
- Culicoides midorensis Arnaud, 1956^{c g}
- Culicoides miharai (Kinoshita)^{i c g}
- Culicoides mihunensis Chu, 1983^{c g}
- Culicoides mikros Dyce & Meiswinkel, 1995^{c g}
- Culicoides milnei Austen, 1909^{c g}
- Culicoides minasensis Felippe-Bauer, 1987^{c g}
- Culicoides minimus Wirth & Hubert, 1989^{c g}
- Culicoides minipalpis Wirth & Hubert, 1989^{c g}
- Culicoides minutissimus (Zetterstedt, 1855)^{g}
- Culicoides minutus Sen & Gupta, 1959^{c g}
- Culicoides miombo Meiswinkel, 1991^{c g}
- Culicoides mirsae Ortiz, 1953^{c g}
- Culicoides mirzaevi Glukhova & Khabirov, 1977^{c g}
- Culicoides mississippiensis Hoffman, 1926^{i c g}
- Culicoides miuntissimus (Zetterstedt, 1855)^{c g}
- Culicoides mohave Wirth, 1952^{i c g}
- Culicoides mojingaensis Wirth & Blanton, 1953^{c g}
- Culicoides molestior Kieffer, 1911^{c g}
- Culicoides molestus (Skuse)^{i c g}
- Culicoides mollis Edwards, 1928^{c g}
- Culicoides molotovae Glukhova & Braverman, 1999^{c g}
- Culicoides mongolensis Yao, 1964^{c g}
- Culicoides monicae Spinelli & Borkent, 2004^{c g}
- Culicoides monoensis Wirth, 1952^{i c g}
- Culicoides monothecalis Tokunaga, 1962^{c g}
- Culicoides montanus Shakirzyanova, 1962^{c g}
- Culicoides monticola Wirth & Lee, 1967^{c g}
- Culicoides moreensis Lee & Reye, 1955^{c g}
- Culicoides moreli Clastrier, 1959^{c g}
- Culicoides morisitai Tokunaga, 1940^{c g}
- Culicoides mortivallis Wirth and Blanton, 1971^{i c g}
- Culicoides motoensis Lee, 1979^{c g}
- Culicoides moucheti Cornet & Kremer, 1970^{c g}
- Culicoides mukerjii Gangopadhyay & Dasgupta, 2000^{c g}
- Culicoides mulrennani Beck, 1957^{i c g}
- Culicoides multidentatus Atchley and Wirth, 1975^{i}
- Culicoides multifarious Liu, Gong, Zhang & Shi, 2003^{c g}
- Culicoides multimaculatus Taylor, 1918^{c g}
- Culicoides multinotatae Tokunaga, 1962^{c g}
- Culicoides multipunctatus Malloch, 1915^{i c g}
- Culicoides murphyi Clastrier & Wirth, 1961^{c g}
- Culicoides murrayi Wirth & Hubert, 1989^{c g}
- Culicoides murtalai Boorman & Dipeolu, 1979^{c g}
- Culicoides musajevi Dzhafarov, 1961^{c g}
- Culicoides muscicola Kieffer, 1925^{c g}
- Culicoides mykytowyczi Lee & Reye, 1963^{c g}
- Culicoides mystacinus Vimmer, 1932^{c g}

=== N ===
- Culicoides nagahanai Tokunaga, 1956^{g}
- Culicoides nagarzensis Lee, 1979^{c g}
- Culicoides nairobiensis Glick, 1990^{c g}
- Culicoides nampui Howarth, 1985^{c g}
- Culicoides namulus Kieffer, 1919^{c g}
- Culicoides nanellus Wirth and Blanton, 1969^{i c g}
- Culicoides nanpingensis Yu & Song, 1986^{c g}
- Culicoides nanus Root and Hoffman, 1937^{i c g}
- Culicoides narrabeenensis Lee & Reye, 1963^{c g}
- Culicoides nasuensis Kitaoka, 1984^{c g}
- Culicoides nattaiensis Lee & Reye, 1955^{c g}
- Culicoides navaiae Lane, 1983^{c g}
- Culicoides nayabazari Gupta, 1963^{c g}
- Culicoides neavei Austen, 1912^{c g}
- Culicoides neghmei Vargas, 1955^{c g}
- Culicoides neoangolensis Kremer, 1972^{c g}
- Culicoides neofagineus Wirth and Blanton, 1969^{i c g}
- Culicoides neomelanesiae Tokunaga, 1963^{c g}
- Culicoides neomontanus Wirth, 1976^{i c g}
- Culicoides neopalpalis Tokunaga, 1962^{c g}
- Culicoides neopalpifer Chen, 1983^{g}
- Culicoides neoparaensis Tavares & Alves de Souza, 1978^{c g}
- Culicoides neopulicaris Wirth, 1955^{i c g}
- Culicoides neoschultzei Boorman & Meiswinkel, 1989^{c g}
- Culicoides nevilli Cornet & Brunhes, 1994^{c g}
- Culicoides newsteadi Austen, 1921^{c g}
- Culicoides nielamensis Liu & Deng, 2000^{c g}
- Culicoides niger Root and Hoffman, 1937^{i c g}
- Culicoides nigeriae Ingram & Macfie, 1921^{c g}
- Culicoides nigrigenus Wirth & Blanton, 1956^{c g}
- Culicoides nigripennis Carter, Ingram & Macfie, 1920^{c g}
- Culicoides nigripes Wirth & Hubert, 1989^{c g}
- Culicoides nigritus Fei & Lee, 1984^{c g}
- Culicoides nigroannulatus Goetghebuer, 1932^{c g}
- Culicoides nigrosignatus Kieffer, 1901^{c g}
- Culicoides nigrus Tokunaga, 1941^{c g}
- Culicoides nilogenus Kieffer, 1921^{c g}
- Culicoides nilophilus Kieffer, 1921^{c g}
- Culicoides niphanae Wirth & Hubert, 1989^{c g}
- Culicoides nipponensis Tokunaga, 1955^{c g}
- Culicoides nitens Edwards, 1933^{c g}
- Culicoides nivosus Meillon, 1937^{c g}
- Culicoides nobrei Caeiro, 1961^{c g}
- Culicoides nocivum (Harris, 1841)^{c g}
- Culicoides noshaquensis Tokunaga, 1966^{c g}
- Culicoides notatus Delfinado, 1961^{c g}
- Culicoides novaguineanus Tokunaga, 1959^{c g}
- Culicoides novairelandi Tokunaga, 1962^{c g}
- Culicoides novamexicanus Atchley, 1967^{i c g}
- Culicoides nubeculosus (Meigen, 1830)^{c g}
- Culicoides nudipalpis Delfinado, 1961^{c g}
- Culicoides nudipennis Kieffer, 1922^{c g}
- Culicoides nukabirensis Wada, 1979^{c g}
- Culicoides nunomemoguri Kitaoka, 1980^{c g}
- Culicoides nuntius Cambournac, 1970^{c g}
- Culicoides nupurius Kanasugi & Kitaoka, 2001^{c g}
- Culicoides nyakini Howarth, 1985^{c g}
- Culicoides nyungnoi Howarth, 1985^{c g}

=== O ===
- Culicoides obnoxius Fox, 1952^{c g}
- Culicoides obscuripennis (Clastrier and Wirth)^{i}
- Culicoides obsoletus (Meigen, 1818)^{i c g}
- Culicoides occidentalis Wirth & Jones, 1957^{c g}
- Culicoides ochraceimaculatus Shevchenko, 1970^{c g}
- Culicoides ochraceipennis Shevchenko, 1970^{c g}
- Culicoides ochrothorax Carter, 1919^{c g}
- Culicoides octosignatus Kieffer, 1921^{c g}
- Culicoides oculatus (Strobl, 1910)^{c g}
- Culicoides ocumarensis Ortiz, 1950^{c g}
- Culicoides odai Boorman, 1989^{c g}
- Culicoides odiatus Austen, 1921^{c g}
- Culicoides odiosus Kieffer, 1910^{c g}
- Culicoides okazawai Wada, 1990^{c g}
- Culicoides okinawensis Arnald, 1956^{g}
- Culicoides oklahomensis Khalaf, 1952^{i c g}
- Culicoides olyslageri Kremer & Nevill, 1972^{c g}
- Culicoides omogensis Arnaud, 1956^{c g}
- Culicoides onderstepoortensis Fiedler, 1951^{c g}
- Culicoides onoi Tokunaga, 1940^{c g}
- Culicoides oregonensis Wirth and Rowley, 1971^{i c g}
- Culicoides orestes Wirth & Hubert, 1989^{c g}
- Culicoides orientalis Macfie, 1932^{c g}
- Culicoides orjuelai Wirth & Lee, 1967^{c g}
- Culicoides ornatus Taylor, 1913^{c g}
- Culicoides ostroushkoae Glukhova, 1989^{c g}
- Culicoides ousairani Khalaf, 1952^{i c g}
- Culicoides ovalis Khamala, 1991^{c g}
- Culicoides owyheensis Jones and Wirth, 1978^{i c g}
- Culicoides oxianus Smatov & Kravets, 1976^{c g}

=== P ===
- Culicoides pabloi Browne, 1980^{c g}
- Culicoides pachymerus Lutz, 1914^{c g}
- Culicoides padusae Mirzayeva, 1990^{c g}
- Culicoides paksongi Howarth, 1985^{c g}
- Culicoides palauensis Tokunaga, 1959^{c g}
- Culicoides palawanensis Delfinado, 1961^{c g}
- Culicoides pallidicornis Kieffer, 1919^{c g}
- Culicoides pallidimaculosus Tokunaga, 1959^{c g}
- Culicoides pallidizonatus Tokunaga, 1963^{c g}
- Culicoides pallidothorax Lee & Reye, 1963^{c g}
- Culicoides pallidulus ^{g}
- Culicoides pallidus Khalaf, 1957^{c g}
- Culicoides palmerae James, 1943^{i c g}
- Culicoides palpalis Macfie, 1948^{c g}
- Culicoides palpifer Gupta & Ghosh, 1956^{c g}
- Culicoides palpisimilis Wirth & Hubert, 1989^{c g}
- Culicoides pamiricus Zhogolev, 1973^{c g}
- Culicoides pampaensis Spinelli, 1991^{c g}
- Culicoides pampangensis Delfinado, 1961^{c g}
- Culicoides pampoikilus Macfie, 1948^{i c g}
- Culicoides panamensis Barbosa, 1947^{c g}
- Culicoides pancensis Browne, 1980^{c g}
- Culicoides pangkorensis Wirth & Hubert, 1989^{c g}
- Culicoides paolae Boorman, 1996^{g}
- Culicoides papillatus Khamala, 1991^{c g}
- Culicoides papilliger Borkent, 1997^{c g}
- Culicoides papuensis Tokunaga, 1962^{c g}
- Culicoides parabarnetti Wirth & Hubert, 1989^{c g}
- Culicoides parabubalus Wirth & Hubert, 1989^{c g}
- Culicoides paradisionensis Boorman, 1988^{c g}
- Culicoides paraensis (Goeldi, 1905)^{i c g}
- Culicoides paraflavescens Wirth & Hubert, 1959^{c g}
- Culicoides paragarciai Dyce, 1996^{c g}
- Culicoides parahumeralis Wirth & Hubert, 1989^{c g}
- Culicoides paraignacioi Spinelli, 1993^{c g}
- Culicoides paraimpunctatus Borkent, 1995^{c g}
- Culicoides paraliui Gupta, 1962^{c g}
- Culicoides paramalayae Wirth & Hubert, 1989^{c g}
- Culicoides parapiliferus Wirth and Blanton, 1974^{i c g}
- Culicoides parararipalpis Gupta, 1963^{c g}
- Culicoides parascopus Wirth & Blanton, 1978^{c g}
- Culicoides parauapebensis ^{g}
- Culicoides paregrinus Kieffer, 1910^{g}
- Culicoides parensis (Goeldi, 1905)^{c g}
- Culicoides parroti Kieffer, 1922^{c g}
- Culicoides parvimaculatus Lee & Reye, 1953^{c g}
- Culicoides parviscriptus Tokunaga, 1959^{c g}
- Culicoides parvulus Khamala, 1991^{c g}
- Culicoides pastus Kitaoka, 1980^{c g}
- Culicoides patulipalpis Wirth & Blanton, 1959^{c g}
- Culicoides paucienfuscatus Barbosa, 1947^{c g}
- Culicoides paulipictus Tokunaga, 1977^{c g}
- Culicoides pechumani Cochrane, 1974^{i c g}
- Culicoides pecosensis Wirth, 1955^{i c g}
- Culicoides peculiaris Gangopadhyay & Dasgupta, 2000^{c g}
- Culicoides peliliouensis (Tokunaga)^{i c g}
- Culicoides pellucidus Khamala, 1991^{c g}
- Culicoides pendleburyi Wirth & Hubert, 1989^{c g}
- Culicoides pentamaculatus Smatov & Kravets, 1976^{c g}
- Culicoides perakensis Kitaoka, 1983^{c g}
- Culicoides peregrinus Kieffer, 1910^{c g}
- Culicoides perettii Cornet & Chateau, 1971^{c g}
- Culicoides perornatus Delfinado, 1961^{c g}
- Culicoides peruvianus Felippe-Bauer, 2003^{c g}
- Culicoides petersi Tokunaga, 1962^{c g}
- Culicoides phaeonotus Wirth & Blanton, 1959^{c g}
- Culicoides phlebotomus (Williston)^{i c g}
- Culicoides photophilus Kieffer, 1911^{c g}
- Culicoides picadoae Spinelli & Borkent, 2004^{c g}
- Culicoides pichindensis Browne, 1980^{c g}
- Culicoides pictellum (Rondani, 1869)^{c g}
- Culicoides pictilis Wirth & Hubert, 1989^{c g}
- Culicoides pictipennis (Staeger, 1839)^{c g}
- Culicoides picturatus Kremer & Deduit, 1961^{c g}
- Culicoides pifanoi Ortiz, 1951^{c g}
- Culicoides pikongkoi Howarth, 1985^{c g}
- Culicoides piliferus Root and Hoffman, 1937^{i c g}
- Culicoides pilosipennis Kieffer, 1924^{c g}
- Culicoides pilosus Wirth & Blanton, 1959^{c g}
- Culicoides platiradius Tokunaga, 1963^{c g}
- Culicoides plaumanni Spinelli, 1993^{c g}
- Culicoides plebotomus Williston, 1896^{g}
- Culicoides poikilonotus Macfie, 1948^{c g}
- Culicoides polynesiae Wirth & Arnaud, 1969^{c g}
- Culicoides polypori Wirth & Blanton, 1968^{c g}
- Culicoides polystictus Kieffer, 1921^{c g}
- Culicoides pongsomiensis Chu, 1986^{c g}
- Culicoides popayanensis Wirth & Lee, 1967^{c g}
- Culicoides poperinghensis Goetghebuer, 1953^{g}
- Culicoides poperonghensis Goetghebuer, 1953^{c g}
- Culicoides posoensis Wirth and Blanton, 1969^{i c g}
- Culicoides praesignis Delfinado, 1961^{c g}
- Culicoides pretoriensis Kremer & Nevill, 1972^{c g}
- Culicoides profundus Santarem, Felippe-Bauer & Trindade^{g}
- Culicoides prolixipalpis Wirth & Hubert, 1989^{c g}
- Culicoides propinquus Macfie, 1948^{c g}
- Culicoides propriipennis Macfie, 1948^{c g}
- Culicoides pseudocordiger Wirth & Hubert, 1989^{c g}
- Culicoides pseudocrescentis Tavares & Dias, 1980^{c g}
- Culicoides pseudodiabolicus Fox, 1946^{c g}
- Culicoides pseudoheliconiae Felippe-Bauer, 2008^{c g}
- Culicoides pseudoheliophilus Callot & Kremer, 1961^{c g}
- Culicoides pseudolangeroni Kremer, Chaker & Delecolle, 1982^{c g}
- Culicoides pseudopallidipennis Clastrier, 1958^{c g}
- Culicoides pseudopallidus Khalaf, 1961^{c g}
- Culicoides pseudopalpalis Wirth & Hubert, 1989^{c g}
- Culicoides pseudoreticulatus Santarem, Felippe-Bauer & Castellon^{g}
- Culicoides pseudosalinarius Chu, 1981^{c g}
- Culicoides pseudostigmaticus Tokunaga^{g}
- Culicoides pseudostigmatus Tokunaga, 1959^{c g}
- Culicoides pseudoturgidus Gupta, 1962^{c g}
- Culicoides pulchellus Liu & Zhao, 1998^{c g}
- Culicoides pulchripennis Macfie, 1939^{c g}
- Culicoides pulicaris (Linnaeus, 1758)^{c g}
- Culicoides pumilus (Winnertz, 1852)^{c g}
- Culicoides puncticeps Goetghebuer, 1934^{c g}
- Culicoides puncticollis (Becker, 1903)^{c g}
- Culicoides punctithorax Carter, Ingram & Macfie, 1920^{c g}
- Culicoides pungens de Meijere, 1909^{c g}
- Culicoides pungobovis Liu, Ge & Liu, 1996^{c g}
- Culicoides puracensis Wirth & Lee, 1967^{c g}
- Culicoides puripennis Austen, 1921^{c g}
- Culicoides purus Lee & Reye, 1963^{c g}
- Culicoides pusilloides Wirth & Blanton, 1955^{c g}
- Culicoides pusillus Lutz, 1913^{i c g}
- Culicoides pycnostictus Ingram & Macfie, 1925^{c g}
- Culicoides pygmaeus Tokunaga, 1963^{c g}

=== Q-R ===
- Culicoides qabdoensis Lee, 1979^{c g}
- Culicoides qinghaiensis Fei & Lee, 1984^{c g}
- Culicoides qiongzhongensis Liu, Ge & Liu, 1996^{c g}
- Culicoides quadratus Tokunaga, 1951^{c g}
- Culicoides quadrisignatus Kieffer, 1921^{c g}
- Culicoides quadrivittatus Vimmer, 1932^{c g}
- Culicoides quaiparaensis Clastrier, 1971^{c g}
- Culicoides quasiparaensis Clastrier, 1971^{g}
- Culicoides quatei Wirth & Hubert, 1989^{c g}
- Culicoides quaterifasciatus Tokunaga, 1959^{c g}
- Culicoides queenslandae Dyce & Wirth, 1997^{c g}
- Culicoides quinquelineatus Goetghebuer, 1934^{c g}
- Culicoides quinquermaculatus Vimmer, 1932^{c g}
- Culicoides rabauli Macfie, 1939^{c g}
- Culicoides rachoui Tavares & Alves de Souza, 1978^{c g}
- Culicoides radicitus Delfinado, 1961^{c g}
- Culicoides radiomaculatus Khamala, 1991^{c g}
- Culicoides rageaui Vattier & Adam, 1966^{c g}
- Culicoides ragulithecus Wirth & Hubert, 1989^{g}
- Culicoides rangeli Ortiz & Mirsa, 1952^{c g}
- Culicoides raposoensis Wirth & Barreto, 1978^{c g}
- Culicoides raripalpis Smith, 1929^{c g}
- Culicoides rariradialis Gupta, 1963^{c g}
- Culicoides rarus Gupta, 1963^{c g}
- Culicoides ravus Meillon, 1936^{c g}
- Culicoides reconditus Campbell & Pelham-Clinton, 1960^{c g}
- Culicoides recurvus Delfinado, 1961^{c g}
- Culicoides reevesi Wirth, 1952^{i c g}
- Culicoides remerki Boorman & Dipeolu, 1979^{c g}
- Culicoides remotus Kieffer, 1918^{c g}
- Culicoides reticulatus Lutz, 1913^{c g}
- Culicoides rhizophorensis Khamala, 1991^{c g}
- Culicoides rhombus Santarem, Felippe-Bauer & Castellon^{g}
- Culicoides ribeiroi Lemble, 1991^{c g}
- Culicoides riebi Delecolle, Mathieu & Baldet, 2005^{c g}
- Culicoides riethi Kieffer, 1914^{c g}
- Culicoides riggsi Khalaf, 1957^{i c g}
- Culicoides riouxi Callot & Kremer, 1961^{c g}
- Culicoides ritzei Dzhafarov, 1964^{c g}
- Culicoides robini Cornet, 1970^{c g}
- Culicoides rochemus Cambournac, 1970^{c g}
- Culicoides rochenus Cambournac, 1970^{g}
- Culicoides rodriguezi Ortiz, 1968^{c g}
- Culicoides ronderosae Spinelli & Borkent, 2004^{c g}
- Culicoides rostratus Wirth & Blanton, 1956^{c g}
- Culicoides roswelli Giles & Wirth, 1983^{c g}
- Culicoides rugulithecus Wirth & Hubert, 1989^{c g}
- Culicoides ruiliensis Lee, 1980^{c g}
- Culicoides ruizi Forattini, 1954^{c g}
- Culicoides rutilis Ingram & Macfie, 1921^{c g}
- Culicoides ryckmani Wirth and Hubert, 1960^{i c g}

=== S ===
- Culicoides saboyae Cornet, 1970^{c g}
- Culicoides sabroskyi Tokunaga, 1959^{c g}
- Culicoides saevanicus Dzhafarov, 1960^{c g}
- Culicoides saevus Kieffer, 1922^{c g}
- Culicoides sahariensis Kieffer, 1923^{c g}
- Culicoides saintjusti Tavares & Ruiz, 1980^{c g}
- Culicoides sajanicus Mirzayeva, 1971^{c g}
- Culicoides salebrosus Liu, Gong, Zhang & Shi, 2003^{c g}
- Culicoides salihi Khalaf, 1952^{i c g}
- Culicoides salinarius (Kieffer)^{i c g}
- Culicoides saltaensis Spinelli, 1991^{c g}
- Culicoides saltonensis Wirth, 1952^{i c g}
- Culicoides samoensis Wirth & Arnaud, 1969^{c g}
- Culicoides sanguisuga (Coquillett, 1901)^{i c g}
- Culicoides saninensis Tokunaga, 1956^{c g}
- Culicoides sanmartini Wirth & Barreto, 1978^{c g}
- Culicoides santanderi Browne, 1980^{c g}
- Culicoides santonicus Callot, Kremer, Rault & Bach, 1966^{c g}
- Culicoides sarawakensis Wirth & Hubert, 1959^{c g}
- Culicoides saundersi Wirth and Blanton, 1969^{i c g}
- Culicoides scanloni Wirth and Hubert, 1962^{i c g}
- Culicoides schramae Giles, Wirth & Messersmith, 1981^{c g}
- Culicoides schultzei (Enderlein, 1908)^{c g}
- Culicoides scopus Root & Hoffman, 1937^{c g}
- Culicoides scoticus Downes & Kettle, 1952^{c g}
- Culicoides segnis Cambell & Pelham-Clinton, 1960^{c g}
- Culicoides seimi Shevchenko, 1967^{c g}
- Culicoides sejfadinei Dzhafarov, 1958^{c g}
- Culicoides selandicus Nielsen & Kristensen, 2015
- Culicoides selangorensis Wirth & Hubert, 1989^{c g}
- Culicoides sellersi Boorman & Dipeolu, 1979^{c g}
- Culicoides semicircum Tokunaga, 1959^{c g}
- Culicoides semimaculatus Clastrier, 1958^{c g}
- Culicoides sensillatus Mirzayeva, 1971^{c g}
- Culicoides septemmaculatus Goetghebuer, 1935^{c g}
- Culicoides sergenti (Kieffer, 1921)^{c}
- Culicoides shahgudiani Naval, 1973^{c g}
- Culicoides shaklawensis Khalaf, 1957^{c g}
- Culicoides shermani Causey, 1938^{c g}
- Culicoides shimoniensis Khamala, 1991^{c g}
- Culicoides shortti Smith & Swaminath, 1932^{c g}
- Culicoides siamensis Wirth & Hubert, 1989^{c g}
- Culicoides sibiricus Mirzayeva, 1964^{c g}
- Culicoides sierrensis Wirth and Blanton, 1969^{i c g}
- Culicoides sigaensis Tokunaga, 1937^{c g}
- Culicoides sigmoidus Lee & Reye, 1963^{c g}
- Culicoides signatus Kieffer, 1921^{c g}
- Culicoides sikkimensis Gupta, 1963^{c g}
- Culicoides silverstrii Kieffer, 1918^{c g}
- Culicoides similis Carter, Ingram & Macfie, 1920^{c g}
- Culicoides simulans Vimmer, 1932^{c g}
- Culicoides simulator Edwards, 1939^{c g}
- Culicoides sinanoensis Tokunaga, 1937^{c g}
- Culicoides sitiens Wirth and Hubert, 1960^{i c g}
- Culicoides slovacus Orszagh, 1969^{c g}
- Culicoides smeei Tokunaga, 1960^{c g}
- Culicoides snowi Wirth and Jones, 1956^{i c g}
- Culicoides sogdianus Gutsevich, 1966^{c g}
- Culicoides soleamaculatus ^{g}
- Culicoides sommermanae Wirth and Blanton, 1969^{i c g}
- Culicoides sonorensis Wirth & Jones, 1957^{c g}
- Culicoides sordidellus (Zetterstedt, 1838)^{i c g}
- Culicoides sousadiasi Caeiro, 1961^{c g}
- Culicoides sphagnumensis Williams, 1955^{i c g}
- Culicoides spiculae Howarth, 1985^{c g}
- Culicoides spinifer Khamala, 1991^{c g}
- Culicoides spinosus Root and Hoffman, 1937^{i c g}
- Culicoides spinoverbosus Qu & Wang, 1994^{c g}
- Culicoides spinulosus Khamala, 1991^{c g}
- Culicoides spurius Wirth & Blanton, 1959^{c g}
- Culicoides stagetus Lee, 1979^{c g}
- Culicoides stanicicus Shevchenko, 1970^{c g}
- Culicoides stellifer (Coquillett, 1901)^{i c g}
- Culicoides stepicola Remm & Zhogoley, 1968^{c g}
- Culicoides stercorarius Khamala, 1991^{c g}
- Culicoides stigma (Meigen, 1818)^{c g}
- Culicoides stigmalis Wirth, 1952^{c g}
- Culicoides stigmaticus Kieffer, 1911^{c g}
- Culicoides stilobezzioides Foot and Pratt, 1954^{i c g}
- Culicoides stonei James, 1943^{i c g}
- Culicoides suarezi Rodriguez & Wirth, 1986^{c g}
- Culicoides subfagineus Delecolle & Ortega, 1999^{c g}
- Culicoides subfasciipennis Kieffer, 1919^{c g}
- Culicoides subflavescens Wirth & Hubert, 1959^{c g}
- Culicoides subimmaculatus (Lee and Reye)^{i c g}
- Culicoides sublettei Atchley, 1967^{i c g}
- Culicoides subltifrontis Smatov & Isimbekov, 1971^{c g}
- Culicoides submagnesianus Tokunaga, 1962^{c g}
- Culicoides subneglectus Vimmer, 1932^{c g}
- Culicoides suborientalis Tokunaga, 1951^{c g}
- Culicoides subpalpifer Wirth & Hubert, 1989^{c g}
- Culicoides subpunctatus Liu & Yu, 1996^{c g}
- Culicoides subravus Cornet & Chateau, 1971^{c g}
- Culicoides subschultzei Cornet & Brunhes, 1994^{c g}
- Culicoides subsylvarum Remm, 1981^{c g}
- Culicoides sumatrae Macfie, 1934^{c g}
- Culicoides superfluthecus Yu & Li, 1986^{c g}
- Culicoides superfulvus Gupta, 1962^{c g}
- Culicoides suspectus Zhou & Lee, 1984^{c g}
- Culicoides suzukii Kitaoka, 1973^{g}
- Culicoides swaminathi Gangopadhyay & Dasgupta, 2000^{c g}
- Culicoides sylvarum Callot & Kremer, 1961^{c g}
- Culicoides sylvicola Khamala, 1991^{c g}

=== T ===
- Culicoides tadzhikistanicus Zhogoley, 1969^{c g}
- Culicoides tahemanensis Liu & Ma, 2001^{c g}
- Culicoides taiwanensis Kitaoka & Tanaka, 1985^{c g}
- Culicoides talgariensis Gutsevich & Smatov, 1966^{c g}
- Culicoides tamada Howarth, 1985^{c g}
- Culicoides tamaensis Perruolo, 2006^{c g}
- Culicoides tamboensis Wirth & Lee, 1967^{c g}
- Culicoides taonanensis Ren, Wang & Liu, 2006^{c g}
- Culicoides tarapaca Spinelli, 1991^{c g}
- Culicoides tatebeae Kitaoka, 1991^{c g}
- Culicoides tauffiebi Clastrier, 1960^{c g}
- Culicoides tauricus Gutsevich, 1959^{c g}
- Culicoides tavaresi Felippe-Bauer & Wirth, 1988^{c g}
- Culicoides tawauensis Wirth & Hubert, 1989^{c g}
- Culicoides tayulingensis Chen, 1988^{c g}
- Culicoides tbilisicus Dzhafarov, 1964^{c g}
- Culicoides tentorius Austen, 1921^{c g}
- Culicoides tenuifasciatus Wirth & Hubert, 1989^{c g}
- Culicoides tenuilosus Wirth & Blanton, 1959^{c g}
- Culicoides tenuipalpis Wirth & Hubert, 1959^{c g}
- Culicoides tenuistylus Wirth, 1952^{i c g}
- Culicoides teretipalpis Wirth & Barreto, 1978^{c g}
- Culicoides testudinalis Wirth and Hubert, 1962^{i c g}
- Culicoides tetrathyris Wirth & Blanton, 1959^{c g}
- Culicoides thurmanae Wirth & Hubert, 1989^{c g}
- Culicoides tianmushanensis Chu, 1981^{c g}
- Culicoides tibetensis Chu, 1977^{c g}
- Culicoides tidwelli Spinelli, 1993^{c g}
- Culicoides tienhsiangensis Chen, 1988^{c g}
- Culicoides tissoti Wirth and Blanton, 1966^{i c g}
- Culicoides tobaensis Tokunaga, 1937^{c g}
- Culicoides tohokuensis Okada, 1941^{c g}
- Culicoides tokunagai Arnaud, 1956^{c g}
- Culicoides tonmai Howarth, 1985^{c g}
- Culicoides tororensis Khamala, 1991^{c g}
- Culicoides tororoensis Khamala & Kettle, 1971^{c g}
- Culicoides torreyae Wirth and Blanton, 1971^{i c g}
- Culicoides torridus Wirth and Hubert, 1960^{i c g}
- Culicoides towadaensis Okada, 1941^{c g}
- Culicoides toyamaruae Arnaud, 1956^{c g}
- Culicoides transferrans Ortiz, 1953^{c g}
- Culicoides translucens Khamala, 1991^{c g}
- Culicoides trapidoi Wirth & Barreto, 1978^{c g}
- Culicoides travassosi Forattini, 1957^{c g}
- Culicoides travisi Vargas, 1949^{i c g}
- Culicoides triallantionis Howarth, 1985^{c g}
- Culicoides triangulatus Shevchenko, 1970^{c g}
- Culicoides trichopis Meillon, 1937^{c g}
- Culicoides trifasciellus Goetghebuer, 1935^{c g}
- Culicoides trifidus Spinelli & Borkent, 2004^{c g}
- Culicoides trilineatus Fox, 1946^{c g}
- Culicoides trimaculatus McDonald & Wu, 1972^{g}
- Culicoides trimaculipennis Wirth & Hubert, 1989^{c g}
- Culicoides trinidadensis Hoffman, 1925^{c g}
- Culicoides tripallidus Tokunaga, 1959^{c g}
- Culicoides trisignatus Kieffer, 1921^{c g}
- Culicoides tristanii Huttel & Verdier, 1953^{c g}
- Culicoides tristriatulus Hoffman, 1925^{i c g}
- Culicoides tritenuifasciatus Tokunaga, 1959^{c g}
- Culicoides trivittatus Vimmer, 1932^{c g}
- Culicoides trizonatus Tokunaga, 1963^{c g}
- Culicoides tropicalis Kieffer, 1913^{c g}
- Culicoides trouilleti Itoua & Cornet, 1987^{c g}
- Culicoides truncatus Borkent, 2000^{c g}
- Culicoides truncorum Edwards, 1939^{c g}
- Culicoides tsutaensis Wada, 1990^{c g}
- Culicoides tuamsombooni Kitaoka, Takaoka & Choochote, 2005^{c g}
- Culicoides tugaicus Dzhafarov, 1960^{c g}
- Culicoides tunkinensis Mirzayeva, 1985^{c g}
- Culicoides turanicus Gutsevich & Smatov & Isimbekov, 1971^{c g}
- Culicoides turgidus Sen & Gupta, 1959^{c g}
- Culicoides tuttifrutti Meiswinkel & Linton, 2003^{c g}

=== U-V ===
- Culicoides ukrainensis Shevchenko, 1970^{c g}
- Culicoides uncistylus Wirth & Hubert, 1989^{c g}
- Culicoides undentaris Liu, 2002^{c g}
- Culicoides unetensis Perruolo, 2001^{c g}
- Culicoides unicolor (Coquillett, 1905)^{i c g}
- Culicoides unicus Delfinado, 1961^{c g}
- Culicoides uniradialis Wirth & Blanton, 1953^{c g}
- Culicoides univittatus Vimmer, 1932^{c g}
- Culicoides uruguayensis Ronderos, 1991^{c g}
- Culicoides usingeri Wirth, 1952^{i c g}
- Culicoides ustinovi Shevchenko, 1962^{c g}
- Culicoides utahensis Fox, 1946^{i c g}
- Culicoides utowana Jamnback, 1965^{i c g}
- Culicoides vagus Cornet & Chateau, 1971^{c g}
- Culicoides variatus Liu, Ge & Liu, 1996^{c g}
- Culicoides variifrons Glukhova & Ivanov & Glukhova, 1967^{c g}
- Culicoides variipennis (Coquillett, 1901)^{i c g b}
- Culicoides venezulensis Ortiz & Mirsa, 1950^{c g}
- Culicoides venustus Hoffman, 1925^{i c g}
- Culicoides verbosus Tokunaga, 1937^{c g}
- Culicoides verecundus Macfie, 1948^{c g}
- Culicoides vetustus Breidenbaugh & Mullens, 1999^{c g}
- Culicoides vexans (Staeger, 1839)^{c g}
- Culicoides vicinus Clastrier, 1960^{c g}
- Culicoides victoriae Macfie, 1941^{c g}
- Culicoides vidourlensis Callot, Kremer, Molet & Bach, 1968^{c g}
- Culicoides villosipennis Root & Hoffman, 1937^{i c g b}
- Culicoides virginea (Preyssler, 1791)^{c g}
- Culicoides vistulensis (Skierska)^{i}
- Culicoides vitreipennis Austen, 1921^{c g}
- Culicoides vitshumbiensis Goetghebuer, 1935^{c g}
- Culicoides vomensis Boorman & Dipeolu, 1979^{c g}

=== W-Z ===
- Culicoides wadai Kitaoka, 1980^{c g}
- Culicoides walkeri Boorman, 1979^{c g}
- Culicoides wandashanensis Wang & Liu, 1999^{c g}
- Culicoides wansoni Goetghebuer, 1935^{c g}
- Culicoides wardi Boorman, 1989^{c g}
- Culicoides waringi Lee & Reye, 1955^{c g}
- Culicoides wenzeli Delfinado, 1961^{c g}
- Culicoides werneri Wirth and Blanton, 1971^{i c g}
- Culicoides williamsi Spinelli, 2005^{c g}
- Culicoides willistoni Wirth & Blanton, 1953^{c g}
- Culicoides williwilli Lee & Reye, 1955^{c g}
- Culicoides wirthi Foote and Pratt, 1954^{i c g}
- Culicoides wirthomyia Vargas, 1953^{c g}
- Culicoides wisconsinensis Jones, 1956^{i c g}
- Culicoides wokei Fox, 1947^{c g}
- Culicoides wuyiensis Chen, 1981^{c g}
- Culicoides xanifer Wirth & Blanton, 1968^{c g}
- Culicoides xanthoceras Kieffer, 1917^{c g}
- Culicoides xanthogaster Kieffer, 1918^{c g}
- Culicoides xinjiangensis Chu, Qian & Ma, 1982^{c g}
- Culicoides xuguitensis Cao & Chen, 1984^{c g}
- Culicoides yadongensis Chu, 1984^{c g}
- Culicoides yamii Lien, Lin & Weng, 1998^{c g}
- Culicoides yanbianensis Liu, 2006^{c g}
- Culicoides yankari Boorman & Dipeolu, 1979^{c g}
- Culicoides yasumatsui Tokunaga, 1941^{c g}
- Culicoides yemenensis Boorman, 1989^{c g}
- Culicoides yoosti Borkent, 2000^{c g}
- Culicoides yoshimurai Tokunaga, 1941^{c g}
- Culicoides youngi Wirth & Barreto, 1978^{c g}
- Culicoides yuchihensis Lien, Lin & Weng, 1998^{c g}
- Culicoides yukonensis Hoffman, 1925^{i c g}
- Culicoides yunanensis Chu & Liu, 1978^{c g}
- Culicoides zhogolevi Remm & Zhogolev, 1968^{c g}
- Culicoides zikaensis Khamala, 1991^{c g}
- Culicoides zuluensis Meillon, 1936^{c g}
- Culicoides zumbadoi Spinelli & Borkent, 2004^{c g}

Data sources: i = ITIS, c = Catalogue of Life, g = GBIF, b = Bugguide.net
