= Kellie Ann Jurado =

American microbiologist

Kellie Ann Jurado is a Presidential Assistant Professor of Microbiology at the Perelman School of Medicine at the University of Pennsylvania. She is the Principal Investigator at the Jurado Lab. Her team studies early life immunity using emerging viruses. Jurado has published many research papers on topics such as the impact of the Zika virus on cells and the HIV-1 virus. She has contributed and collaborated on many different scientific research projects. She currently has 76 different works under her name that range from topics of early life immunity to how viruses affect fetal development. Jurado mainly specializes in research on early-life immunity, which has been proven to effect life-long health.

== Early life and education ==
Jurado grew up in a small town in southern New Mexico and comes from a family of Mexican heritage. Most of her family members have a business and agricultural background. Her grandfather and father were chili farmers.

She earned her Bachelor of Sciences (BS) from New Mexico State University, and she received her Ph.D. from Harvard University. Then she completed her postdoctoral training at Yale University.

== Awards ==
After Jurado completed her Ph.D., The University of Utah and Cold Spring Harbor Laboratory awarded her the International Uta Von Schwedler Prize for Outstanding Thesis. In 2022, Jurado received Christina Fleischmann Award to Young Women Investigators Award. In 2022, she was also named as one of the 20 Packard Fellows. She received the fellowship for being an innovative scientist for pursuing research new areas. Additionally in 2022, she was honored with the Distinguished Alumni Award for the NMSU College of Arts and Sciences from New Mexico State University where she earned her Bachelor of Science.

In 2020, she was named as one of the Cell Mentor's 100 Inspiring Hispanic/Latinx Scientists in America. The recipients were selected based on scholarly achievement and commitment to diversity, equity, and inclusion.

In 2017, Jurado was awarded L'Oreal USA 2017 for Women in Science along with four other women scientists. Grants were awarded to them for their groundbreaking research and commitment to closing the gender gap in STEM fields.
