= Tamada (disambiguation) =

Tamada (Georgian: თამადა) is a toastmaster in Georgia.

Tamada may also refer to:

== People ==
- Abderrahmane Tamada (born 1985), Tunisian former track and field athlete
- Makoto Tamada (born 1976), Japanese motorcycle racer
- Keiji Tamada (born 1980), Japanese association footballer
- Yasuko Tamada (born 1967), Japanese mixed martial artist
- Momona Tamada (born 2006), Canadian actress

== Other uses ==
- Diocese of Tamada, an ancient town still in use as a titular bishopric
- Culicoides tamada, a biting midge in the genus Culicoides
- Bir Tamada or Bir al-Tamada, the site of an Egyptian airfield bombed in the Six-Day War
