= Culicoides ronderosae =

Scientific classification
- Domain: Eukaryota
- Kingdom: Animalia
- Phylum: Arthropoda
- Class: Insecta
- Order: Diptera
- Family: Ceratopogonidae
- Genus: Culicoides
- Subgenus: Diphaomyia
- Species: C. ronderosae

Binomial name
- Culicoides ronderosae Spinelli & Borkent (2004)

Species of fly

Culicoides ronderosae is a species of Culicoides.
