= Culicoides villosipennis =

Scientific classification
- Domain: Eukaryota
- Kingdom: Animalia
- Phylum: Arthropoda
- Class: Insecta
- Order: Diptera
- Family: Ceratopogonidae
- Genus: Culicoides
- Subgenus: Amossovia
- Species: C. villosipennis

Binomial name
- Culicoides villosipennis Root & Hoffman, 1937

Species of fly

Culicoides villosipennis is a species of biting midge in the family Ceratopogonidae.
