= Culicoides hermani =

Scientific classification
- Domain: Eukaryota
- Kingdom: Animalia
- Phylum: Arthropoda
- Class: Insecta
- Order: Diptera
- Family: Ceratopogonidae
- Genus: Culicoides
- Subgenus: Avaritia
- Species: C. hermani

Binomial name
- Culicoides hermani Spinelli & Borkent, 2004

Species of fly

Culicoides hermani is a species of Culicoides. It is found in Central America.
