= Culicoides trifidus =

Scientific classification
- Domain: Eukaryota
- Kingdom: Animalia
- Phylum: Arthropoda
- Class: Insecta
- Order: Diptera
- Family: Ceratopogonidae
- Genus: Culicoides
- Species: C. trifidus

Binomial name
- Culicoides trifidus Spinelli & Borkent (2004)

Species of fly

Culicoides trifidus is a species of Culicoides.
