= Culicoides monicae =

Scientific classification
- Domain: Eukaryota
- Kingdom: Animalia
- Phylum: Arthropoda
- Class: Insecta
- Order: Diptera
- Family: Ceratopogonidae
- Genus: Culicoides
- Subgenus: Anilomyia
- Species: C. monicae

Binomial name
- Culicoides monicae Spinelli & Borkent (2004)

Species of fly

Culicoides monicae is a species of Culicoides.
