= Culicoides kalix =

Scientific classification
- Kingdom: Animalia
- Phylum: Arthropoda
- Class: Insecta
- Order: Diptera
- Family: Ceratopogonidae
- Genus: Culicoides
- Subgenus: Culicoides
- Species: C. kalix

Binomial name
- Culicoides kalix Nielsen, Kristensen & Pape, 2015

Species of fly

Culicoides kalix is a species of midges found in Scandinavia. It can be differentiated from its cogenerated by wing and maxillary palp characteristics.

The species was first described in March 2015 by Søren Achim Nielsen and Michael Kristensen. However, the name-bearing types were not explicitly fixed, violating Article 16.4.1 of the International Code of Zoological Nomenclature (ICZN). The species was therefore formally (re-)described in November 2015 by Nielsen, Kristensen and a third author, Thomas Pape.
