= Culicoides crepuscularis =

Scientific classification
- Domain: Eukaryota
- Kingdom: Animalia
- Phylum: Arthropoda
- Class: Insecta
- Order: Diptera
- Family: Ceratopogonidae
- Genus: Culicoides
- Subgenus: Beltranmyia
- Species: C. crepuscularis

Binomial name
- Culicoides crepuscularis Malloch, 1915

Species of biting midge

Culicoides crepuscularis is a species of biting midge in the family Ceratopogonidae.
