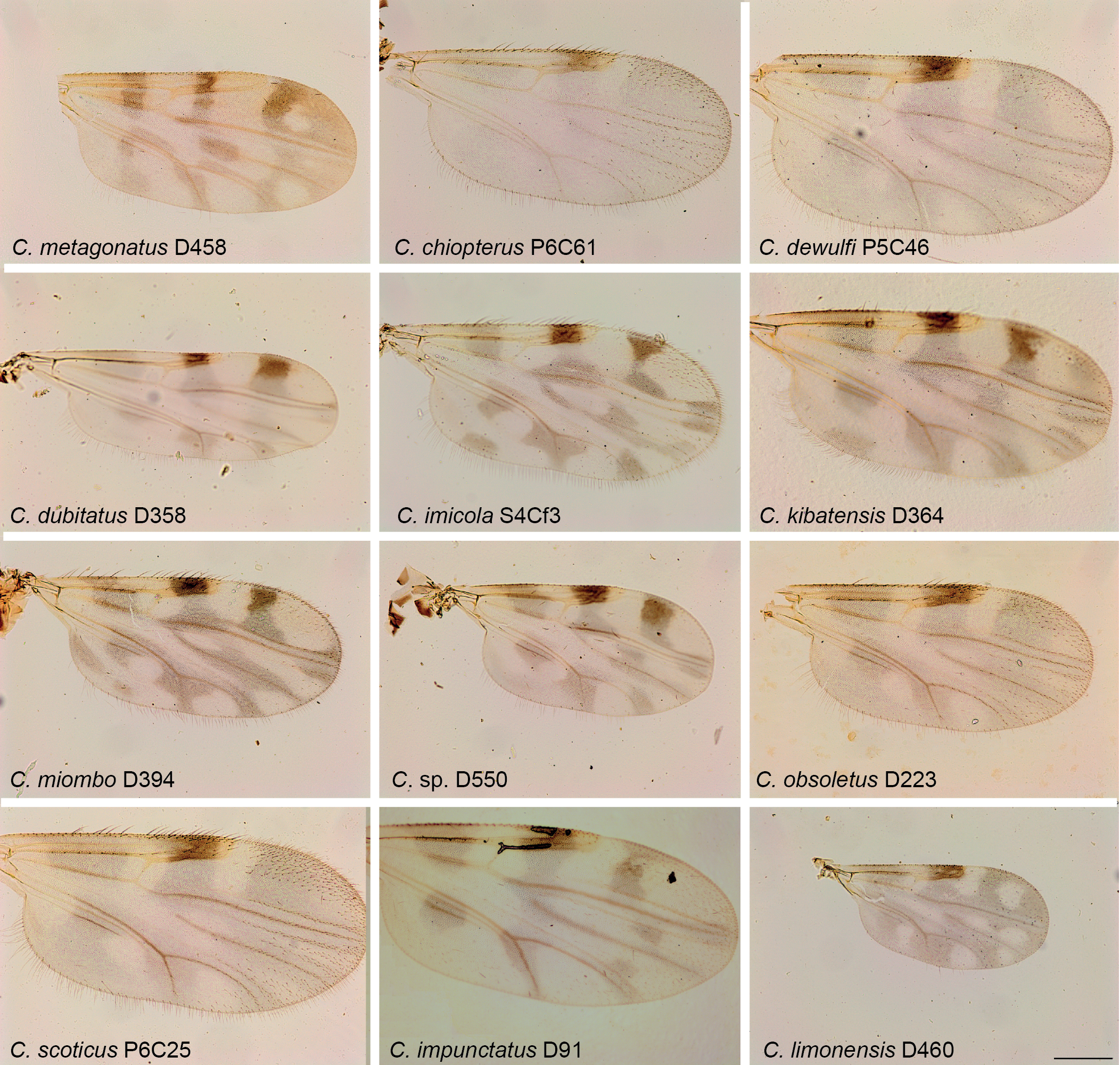
- Wings of several species of Culicoides, including C. obsoletus

Scientific classification
- Kingdom: Animalia
- Phylum: Arthropoda
- Clade: Pancrustacea
- Class: Insecta
- Order: Diptera
- Family: Ceratopogonidae
- Genus: Culicoides
- Subgenus: Avaritia
- Species: C. obsoletus

Binomial name
- Culicoides obsoletus (Meigen, 1818)

= Culicoides obsoletus =

Species of midge

Culicoides obsoletus the name of a species (and a species group) of midges in the subgenus Avaritia. According to a molecular phylogeny, Avaritia is monophyletic, and Culicoides obsoletus, Culicoides scoticus and Culicoides chiopterus should be part of the Obsoletus complex whereas Culicoides dewulfi should be excluded from it.

The species group covers five closely related species:

- Culicoides chiopterus
- Culicoides dewulfi
- Culicoides scoticus
- Culicoides obsoletus
- Culicoides montanus

Sometimes, a reference can be made to the Obsoletus complex. This complex consists of three species, namely:

- Culicoides obsoletus
- Culicoides scoticus
- Culicoides montanus

If reference is made only to Culicoides obsoletus s.str., it means only

- Culicoides obsoletus

Culicoides obsoletus is thought to be the main vector of the BTV8 outbreak in Northern Europe.
