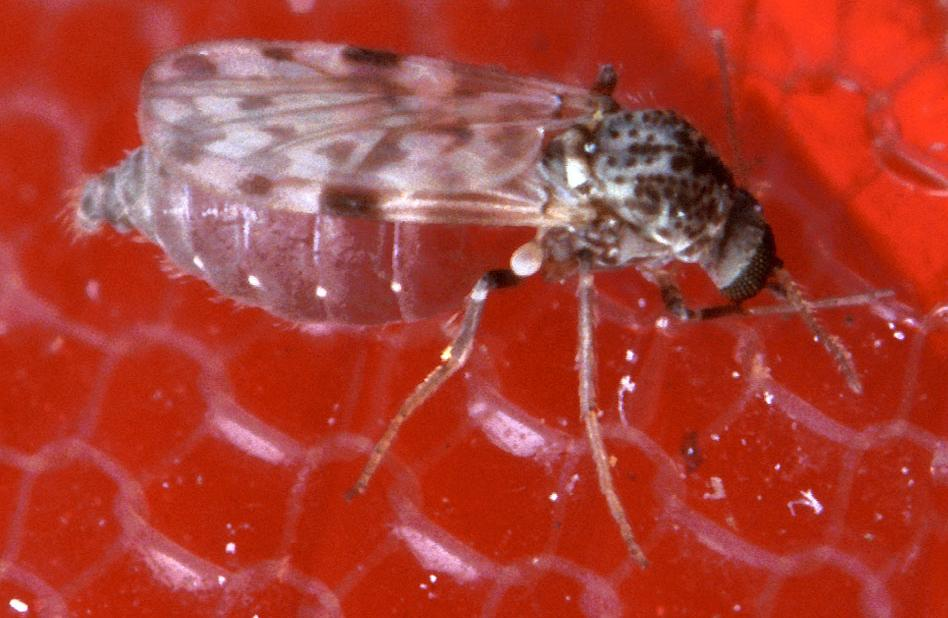
- Culicoides sonorensis after blood meal

Scientific classification
- Kingdom: Animalia
- Phylum: Arthropoda
- Clade: Pancrustacea
- Class: Insecta
- Order: Diptera
- Family: Ceratopogonidae
- Subfamily: Ceratopogoninae
- Tribe: Culicoidini
- Genus: Culicoides; Latreille, 1809

Subgenera
- Numerous, see text

= Culicoides =

Culicoides Temporal range: Late Cretaceous–Present

Genus of biting midges

Culicoides is a genus of biting midges in the family Ceratopogonidae. There are over 1000 species in the genus, which is divided into many subgenera. Several species are known to be vectors of various diseases and parasites which can affect animals. The genus has a long fossil record, with earliest known fossils being from Burmese amber, around 99 million years old.

== Notable taxa ==
The systematics and taxonomy of this genus are confused. A large number of species are of unknown relation to those that have been assigned to subgenera already. Furthermore, many subgenera are sometimes elevated to full genus status, or additional genera (such as Paradasyhelea) are included as subgenera herein.

A widely cited, periodically updated, subgeneric classification of species of Culicoides begins with the warning that the traditional approach to classification of species in this genus has led to "phylogenetic chaos". Some of the specific consequences are mentioned, as well as recommendations for future work. A molecular phylogeny based on 42 species from 3 continents was proposed in 2017. In this work, the authors found that the subgenera Monoculicoides, Culicoides, Haematomyidium, Hoffmania, Remmia and Avaritia (including the main vectors of bluetongue virus disease) were monophyletic, whereas the subgenus Oecacta was paraphyletic. The study validated the subgenus Remmia (= Schultzei group) as a valid subgenus, outside of the subgenus Oecacta. The authors also considered that in Europe, Culicoides obsoletus, Culicoides scoticus and Culicoides chiopterus should be part of the Obsoletus complex whereas Culicoides dewulfi should be excluded from this complex. The authors concluded that the current Culicoides classification needed to be revisited with modern tools.

- Subgenus Avaritia

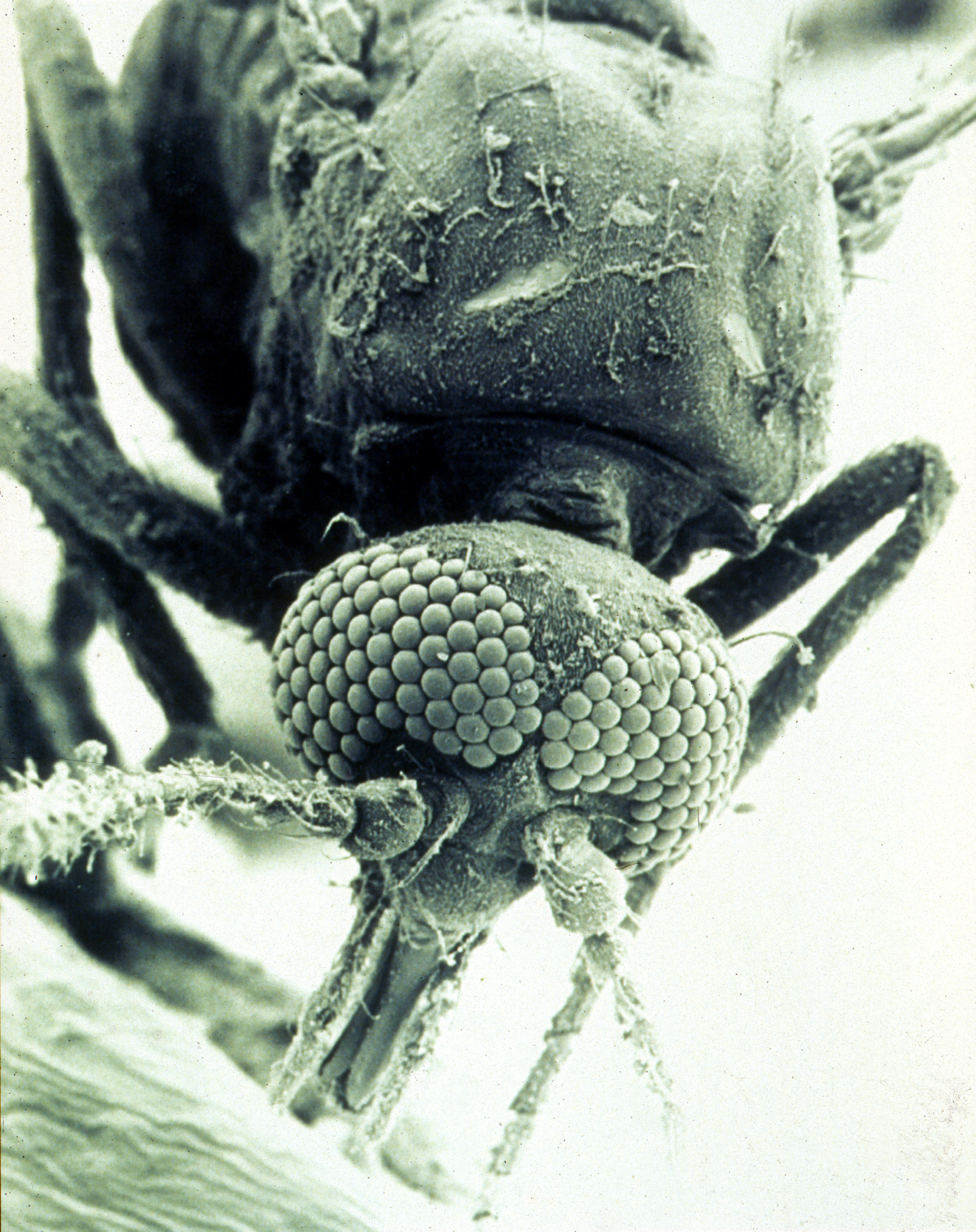
Culicoides brevitarsis

Culicoides impunctatus (left) and culicine mosquito (right)

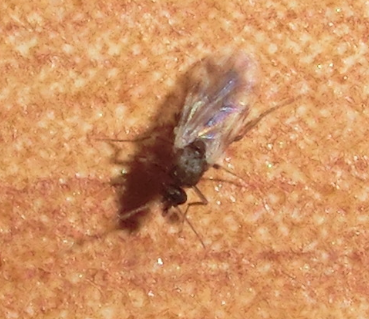
Culicoides impunctatus

  - Culicoides brevitarsis - suspected as vector of Akabane and Aino virus
  - Culicoides imicola - main vector of bluetongue virus and African Horse Sickness in Southern Europe
  - Culicoides chiopterus -
  - Culicoides dewulfi -
  - Culicoides obsoletus -
  - Culicoides scoticus -
- Subgenus Beltranmyia
  - Culicoides circumscriptus
  - Culicoides crepuscularis
  - Culicoides manchuriensis
  - Culicoides salinarius
- Subgenus Culicoides
  - Culicoides boyi
  - Culicoides delta
  - Culicoides fagineus
  - Culicoides grisescens
  - Culicoides impunctatus (Highland midge) - vector for Haemoproteus spp.
  - Culicoides kalix
  - Culicoides newsteadi
  - Culicoides nipponensis
  - Culicoides pulicaris
  - Culicoides punctatus
  - Culicoides selandicus
- Subgenus Drymodesmyia
  - Culicoides loughnani
- Subgenus Haematomyidium
  - Culicoides insinuatus
  - Culicoides paraensis - vector of Oropouche virus
- Subgenus Haemophoructus
  - Culicoides gemellus
- Subgenus Hoffmania
  - Culicoides foxi
  - Culicoides fusipalpis
  - Culicoides ignacioi
  - Culicoides insignis
  - Culicoides lutzi
  - Culicoides maruim
  - Culicoides paramaruim
- Subgenus Macfiella
  - Culicoides phlebotomus
- Subgenus Meijerehelea
  - Culicoides guttifer
- Subgenus Monoculicoides
  - Culicoides nubeculosus
  - Culicoides variipennis
- Subgenus Oecacta
  - Culicoides furens transmits Mansonella ozzardi
- Subgenus Remmia
  - Culicoides oxystoma
- Subgenus Tokunagahelea
  - Culicoides pygmaeus
- Subgenus Trithecoides
  - Culicoides anophelis

Species incertae sedis include:

- limai group
  - Culicoides limai
- fluviatilis group
  - Culicoides fluviatilis
  - Culicoides leopodoi
- reticulatus group
  - Culicoides guyanensis
  - Culicoides paucienfuscatus
  - Culicoides reticulatus

== Description ==
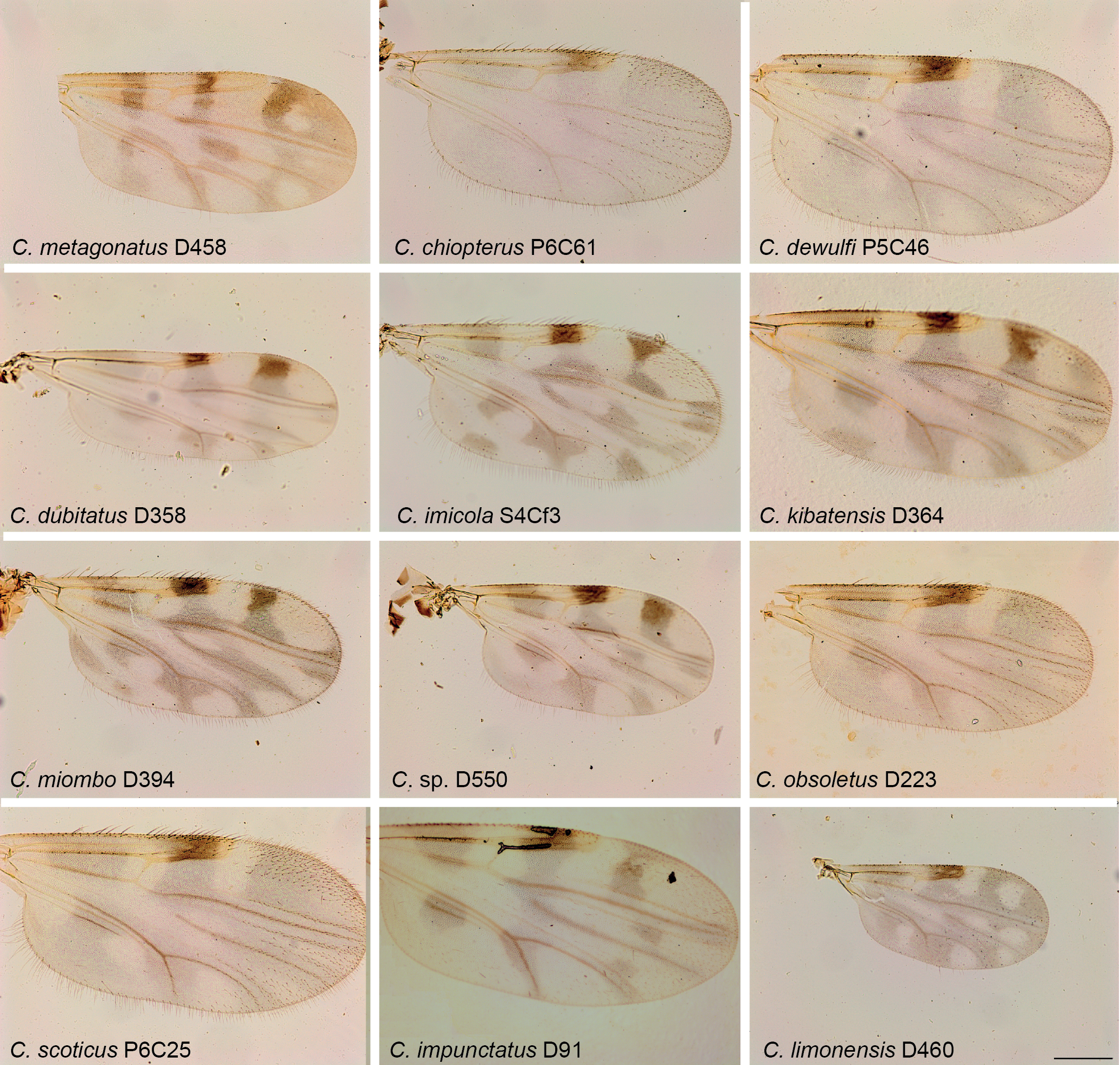
Wing pattern of 12 species of Culicoides

Adults are small dark insects about 1–3 mm long. The antennae are long (15 segments) densely haired in the males and less hairy in females. The thorax is hooped and carries a pair of broad mottled wings. Only the first two longitudinal veins are distinct. Midges are morphologically distinct from mosquitoes, lacking a proboscis, limiting their ability to bite through clothing.

Both males and females feed on nectar, however only the females take a blood meal, which is needed for the maturation of fertilized eggs. Females typically bite at dusk or dawn often in dense swarms and usually in the vicinity of water, marshes or rotting vegetation.

== Life cycle ==
Females lay their eggs en masse in a range of habitats ranging from water vegetation, slow running streams, damp soil or on manure heaps. These hatch into tiny smooth white larvae with four pairs of anal gills. Pupae consist of a fused cephalothorax with slender respiratory trumpets and a segmented abdomen. Adults emerge through a straight slit after 3–7 days.

Species of Culicoides feed on a variety of mammal hosts, including humans. The bite of Culicoides is felt as a sharp prick and is often followed by irritating lumps that may disappear in a few hours or last for days.

== As a vector ==
Various Culicoides species have been shown to be vectors for the following viruses and conditions: Mansonella spp. (M. ozzardi, M. perstans, M. streptocerca), Onchocerca gibsoni and O. cervicalis, Leucocytozoon, Plasmodium agamae, bluetongue virus, Oropouche virus, Schmallenberg virus, African horse sickness, bovine ephemeral fever (C. osystoma and C. nipponesis), Akabane virus, Queensland itch and epizootic hemorrhagic disease. A typical cycle of transmission of a virus by Culicoides is illustrated in the article Parasitic flies of domestic animals. Three species of Culicoides are established vectors for three species of Apicomplexan parasites of the genus Hepatocystis.

=== Bluetongue virus in Northern Europe ===
In 2006, bluetongue virus was first recorded in Northern Europe. In 2007 and 2008, there were huge outbreaks, going as far as Norway, but in 2009 the outbreak was smaller. The main vector of the virus in Southern Europe does not live in Northern Europe, so other species have been screened. Species belonging to the Culicoides obsoletus complex and the Culicoides pulicaris complex have been found capable of bluetongue transmission.

== See also ==
- List of Culicoides species
