= Lambdavirus =

Virus classification
- (unranked): Virus
- Realm: Duplodnaviria
- Kingdom: Heunggongvirae
- Phylum: Uroviricota
- Class: Caudoviricetes
- Genus: Lambdavirus

Genus of viruses

The structure of bacteriophage lambda at atomic resolution is presented here. From left to right: The Chimera software structure is depicted, the Maestro software electrostatics structure is depicted, and the ChimeraX software hydrophilicity structure is depicted in orange-green

Lambdavirus is a genus of viruses in the class Caudoviricetes. Bacteria serve as natural hosts, with transmission achieved through passive diffusion. There are five species in this genus.

== Taxonomy ==
The following species are recognized:

- Lambdavirus DE3
- Lambdavirus HK629
- Lambdavirus HK630
- Lambdavirus lambda
- Lambdavirus lvO276

The genus also includes several unclassified viruses—including the corynephages β and ω, which infect Corynebacterium diphtheriae and carry the deadly diphtheria toxin.

== Structure ==
Lambdaviruses are nonenveloped, with a head and tail. The head is about 60 nm in diameter, consisting of 72 capsomers (T=7, levo).

Genus	Structure	Symmetry	Capsid	Genomic arrangement	Genomic segmentation
Lambdavirus	Head-Tail	T=7, levo	Non-enveloped	Linear	Monopartite

== Genome ==
All species have been fully sequenced. They range between 42k and 49k nucleotides, with 56 to 73 proteins.

== Life cycle ==
The virus attaches to the host cell's adhesion receptors using its terminal fiber, and ejects the viral DNA into the host cytoplasm via long flexible tail ejection system. Viral replication is cytoplasmic. Replication follows the replicative transposition model. DNA-templated transcription is the method of transcription. Translation takes place by -1 ribosomal frameshifting, and +1 ribosomal frameshifting. Once the viral genes have been replicated, the procapsid is assembled and packed. The tail is then assembled and the mature virions are released via lysis, and holin/endolysin/spanin proteins. Bacteria serve as the natural host. Transmission routes are passive diffusion.

Genus	Host details	Tissue tropism	Entry details	Release details	Replication site	Assembly site	Transmission
Lambdavirus	Bacteria	None	Injection	Lysis	Cytoplasm	Cytoplasm	Passive diffusion

== History ==
According to ICTV's taxon history:

- Lambda phage appeared in the first report of 1971, unassigned to order, family, or subfamily.
- Genus Lambda phage group created in the second report (1975). To it were also added three phages: PA2, phiD328, and phi80 (none of which are in 2024 Lambdavirus).
- Assigned to family Siphoviridae in 1984 upon the family's creation.
- Renamed to Lambda-like phages in sixth report (1995). By this point phi80 and PA2 were still in the genus. HK022, HK97, phiD328 were abolished.
- Siphoviridae moved to newly created order Caudovirales in 1998.
- Renamed to Lambda-like viruses in ICTV's seventh report in 1999.
- In 2012, the genus was renamed again, to Lambdalikevirus.
- The genus was renamed to Lambdavirus in 2015.
- Siphoviridae abolished in 2021.

=== Circumscription ===
The scope of the genus has changed significantly in its evolution. Originally a group of all so-called lambdoid phages (synonyms Lambda-like viruses, Lambda-like phages, Lambda phage group), its scope has narrowed significantly.

- HK022 and HK97 were abolished in 1995 but re-admitted in 2004 into this genus. In 2017 they became genus Hk97virus. In 2018 HK022 was moved to Hendrixvirus by rename of the genus. In 2019 HK022 was moved to its own genus Shamshuipovirus.
- PA2 was abolished at an unknown date and re-admitted in 2016 in the genus Tl2011virus. In 2018 it was moved to Oslovirus by rename of the genus.
- phiD328 and phi80 are not found anywhere in the 2024 ICTV taxonomy.

Given the above history, the latest document that defines the boundary of the genus is the 2017 document that created Hk97virus. Unfortunately the document does not specifically address the inclusion criteria for Lambdavirus, only the evidence for their new genus being monophyletic and reasonably similar with each other. The only part that shows the similarity among the members of Lambdavirus was in figure 2, a Gegenees BLASTN analysis using window of 100 bp and a slide of 50 bp. The lowest Gegeenes similarity among members of the group was 62.5%. The general guideline from ICTV's Bacterial and Archaeal Viruses Subcommitee in 2017 was 50% nucleotide similarity.

The term lambdoid phage remains commonly used. It originally consisted of an operational definition of "phages that can recombine with lambda and form a functional, recombinant phage". The term was slightly expanded in the genomic era to mean phages that have a similar-enough functional gene order and at least some patch of homology so that, if hypothetically recombined with lambda, it would form a functional phage with all required genes. The possibility of recombination does not necessarily imply a recent common ancestor and the apparently recombinant character of P22 adds to the problem. Phages that have been called lambdoid include members as diverse as Lederbergvirus P22, Byrnievirus HK97, Salmonella phage ES18, Salmonella phage Gifsy-2, and Traversvirus tv933W.
