= Aeromonas virus phiO18P =

Bielevirus phiO18P

Virus classification
- (unranked): Virus
- Realm: Duplodnaviria
- Kingdom: Heunggongvirae
- Phylum: Uroviricota
- Class: Caudoviricetes
- Order: Caudovirales (abolished 2021)
- Family: Myoviridae
- Genus: Bielevirus
- Species: Bielevirus phiO18P

Species of virus

Aeromonas virus phiO18P is a virus of the family Peduoviridae , genus Bielevirus.
