= Pasteurella virus F108 =

Virus classification
- (unranked): Virus
- Realm: Duplodnaviria
- Kingdom: Heunggongvirae
- Phylum: Uroviricota
- Class: Caudoviricetes
- Order: Caudovirales
- Family: Myoviridae
- Genus: Irtavirus
- Species: Pasteurella virus F108

Pasteurella virus F108 is a temperate bacteriophage (a virus that infects bacteria) of the family Myoviridae, genus Hpunavirus. Its morphology is complex, with hexagonal head and a long contractile tail.
