= Burkholderia virus phi52237 =

Virus classification
- (unranked): Virus
- Realm: Duplodnaviria
- Kingdom: Heunggongvirae
- Phylum: Uroviricota
- Class: Caudoviricetes
- Order: Caudovirales
- Family: Myoviridae
- Genus: Tigrvirus
- Species: Burkholderia virus phi52237

Species of virus

Burkholderia virus phi52237 is a bacteriophage (a virus that infects bacteria) of the family Myoviridae, genus Tigrvirus.
