= Ralstonia virus RSA1 =

Aresaunavirus RSA1

Virus classification
- (unranked): Virus
- Realm: Duplodnaviria
- Kingdom: Heunggongvirae
- Phylum: Uroviricota
- Class: Caudoviricetes
- Order: Caudovirales (abolished 2021)
- Family: Myoviridae
- Genus: Aresaunavirus
- Species: Aresaunavirus RSA1

Species of virus

Ralstonia virus RSA1 is a virus of the family Peduoviridae, genus Aresaunavirus.

As a member of the group I of the Baltimore classification, Ralstonia virus RSA1 is a dsDNA viruses. Its genome is linear. The propagation of the virions includes the attaching to a host cell (a bacterium, as Ralstonia virus RSA1 is a bacteriophage) and the injection of the double stranded DNA; the host transcribes and translates it to manufacture new particles. To replicate its genetic content requires host cell DNA polymerases and, hence, the process is highly dependent on the cell cycle.

Its genome is 38,760 base pairs long with 65.3% of GC content and 5′-extruding cohesive ends; contains 51 open reading frames.
