= Salmonella virus Fels2 =

Virus classification
- (unranked): Virus
- Realm: Duplodnaviria
- Kingdom: Heunggongvirae
- Phylum: Uroviricota
- Class: Caudoviricetes
- Order: Caudovirales
- Family: Myoviridae
- Genus: Felsduovirus
- Species: Salmonella virus Fels2

Species of virus

Salmonella virus Fels2 is a virus of the family Myoviridae, genus Felsduovirus.

As a member of the group I of the Baltimore classification, Salmonella virus Fels2 is a dsDNA viruses. All the family Myoviridae members share a nonenveloped morphology consisting of a head and a tail separated by a neck. Its genome is linear. The propagation of the virions includes the attaching to a host cell (a bacterium, as Salmonella virus Fels2 is a bacteriophage) and the injection of the double stranded DNA; the host transcribes and translates it to manufacture new particles. To replicate its genetic content requires host cell DNA polymerases and, hence, the process is highly dependent on the cell cycle.
