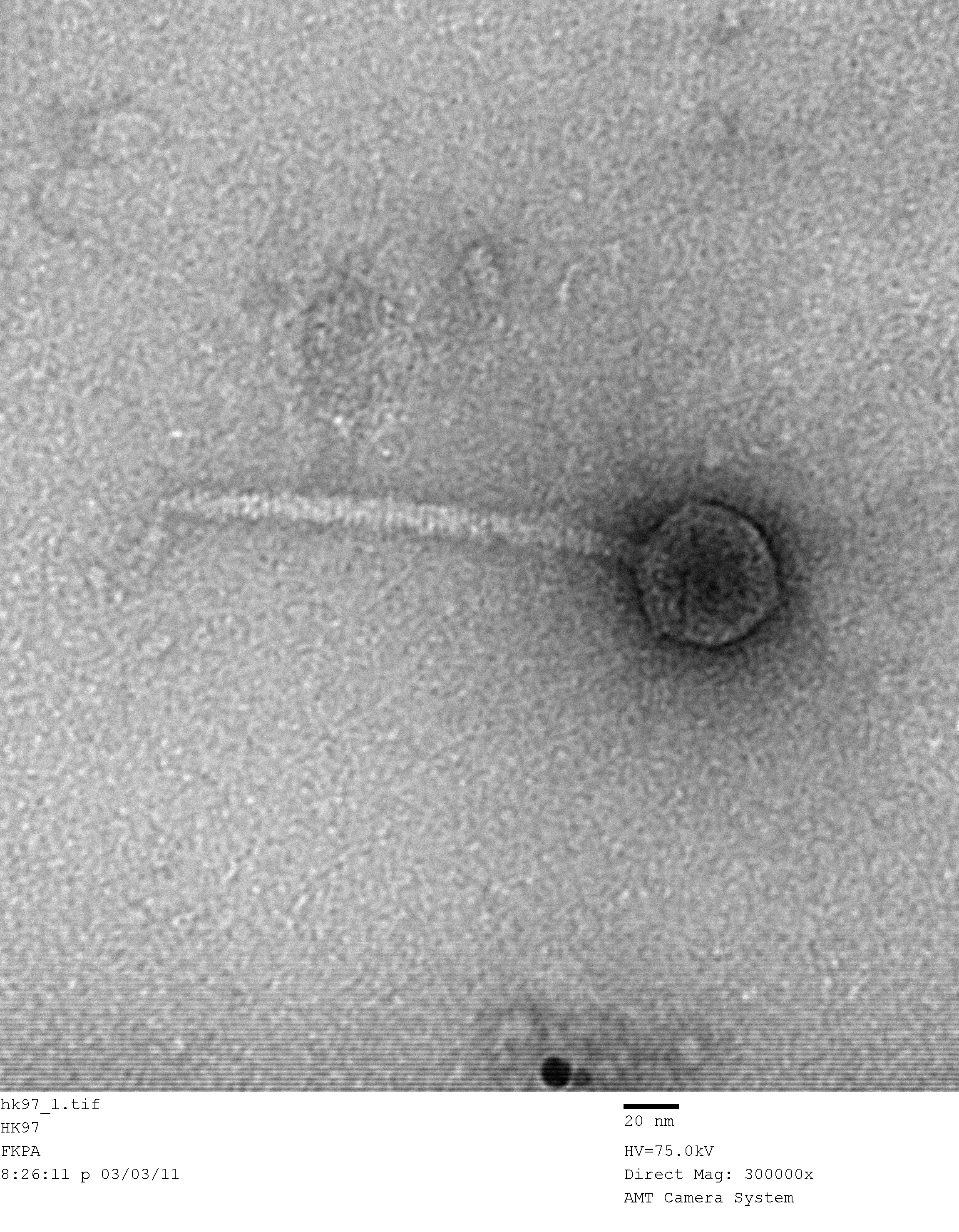
- TME picture of an Escherichia virus HK97 virion, Siphoviridae

Virus classification
- (unranked): Virus
- Realm: Duplodnaviria
- Kingdom: Heunggongvirae
- Phylum: Uroviricota
- Class: Caudoviricetes
- Order: Caudovirales (abolished 2021)
- Family: Siphoviridae

Genera
- see text

Synonyms
- Styloviridae

= Siphoviridae =

Family of viruses

Siphoviridae was a family of double-stranded DNA viruses in the order Caudovirales. The family Siphoviridae and order Caudovirales have now been abolished, with the term siphovirus now used to refer to the morphology of viruses in this former family. Bacteria and archaea serve as natural hosts. The family had 1,166 species, assigned to 366 genera and 22 subfamilies. The characteristic structural features are a non-enveloped head and non-contractile tail.

== Structure ==
Typical siphovirus structure

Viruses in the former family Siphoviridae are non-enveloped, with icosahedral and head-tail geometries (morphotype B1) or a prolate capsid (morphotype B2), and T=7 symmetry. Their diameters are around 60 nm. Members of this family are also characterized by their filamentous, cross-banded, non-contractile tails, usually with short terminal and subterminal fibers. Genomes are double stranded and linear, around 50 kb in length.

== Life cycle ==
Viral replication is cytoplasmic. Entry into the host cell is achieved by adsorption into the host cell. Replication follows the replicative transposition model. DNA-templated transcription is the method of transcription. Translation takes place by -1 ribosomal frameshifting, and +1 ribosomal frameshifting. The virus exits the host cell by lysis, and holin, endolysin, or spanin proteins. Bacteria and archaea serve as the natural host. Transmission routes are passive diffusion.

== Taxonomy ==
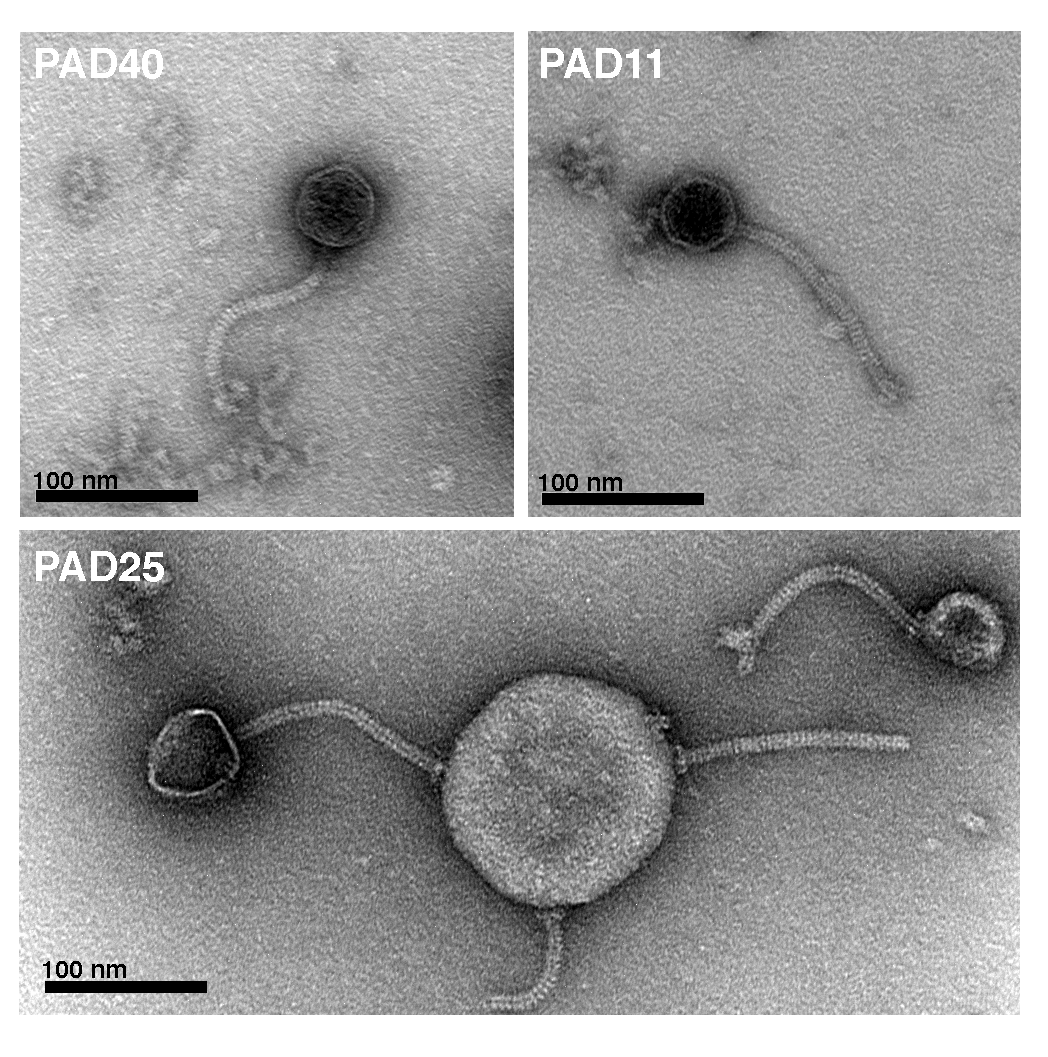
Electron micrographs of negatively stained siphovirus from Cutibacterium acnes. In the lower image PAD25 is adhering to bacterial cell debris, and two phages have lost their heads.

The following subfamilies are recognized:

- Arquatrovirinae
  - Arquatrovirus
  - Camvirus
  - Likavirus
- Azeredovirinae
  - Dubowvirus
  - Phietavirus
- Bclasvirinae
  - Acadianvirus
  - Coopervirus
  - Pregunavirus
  - Pipefishvirus
  - Rosebushvirus
- Bronfenbrennervirinae
  - Biseptimavirus
  - Peevelvirus
- Chebruvirinae
  - Brujitavirus
- Dclasvirinae
  - Hawkeyvirus
  - Plotvirus
- Deejayvirinae
  - Kenoshvirus
  - Secretariavirus
  - Tanisvirus
- Dolichocephalovirinae
  - Berteleyvirus
  - Colossusvirus
  - Poidextervirus
  - Spirovirus
- Gochnauervirinae
  - Dragolirvirus
  - Harrisonvirus
  - Vegavirus
  - Wandersvirus
- Guernseyvirinae
  - Cornelivirus
  - Jerseyvirus
  - Kagunavirus
- Gutmannvirinae
  - Carmenvirus
  - Pobcunavirus
- Hendrixvirinae
  - Brynievirus
  - Cauhtlivirus
  - Kwaitsingvirus
  - Nochtlivirus
  - Sainkungvirus
  - Shamshuipovirus
  - Wainchavirus
  - Wongtaivirus
  - Yautsimvirus
- Langleyhallvirinae
  - Getalongvirus
  - Horusvirus
  - Phystavirus
- Mccleskeyvirinae
  - Limdunavirus
  - Unaquatrovirus
- Mclasvirinae
  - Bongovirus
  - Reyvirus
- Nclasvirinae
  - Bettesrvirus
  - Charlievirus
  - Redivirus
- Nymbaxtervirinae
  - Baxtervirus
  - Nymphaduravirus
- Pclasvirinae
  - Bignuzvirus
  - Fisburnevirus
  - Phayoncevirus
- Queuovirinae
  - Amoyvirus
  - Nipunavirus
  - Nonagvirus
  - Seuratvirus
- Skryabinvirinae
  - Bambunaquatrovirus
  - Puchinovirus
- Trabyvirinae
  - Jelitavirus
  - Slepowrronvirus
- Tybeckvirinae
  - Douglasvirus
  - Lenusvirus
  - Lideunavirus
  - Maenadvirus

The following genera are unassigned to a subfamily:

- Abbeymikolonvirus
- Abidjanvirus
- Agmunavirus
- Aguilavirus
- Ahduovirus
- Alachuavirus
- Alegriavirus
- Amigovirus
- Anatolevirus
- Andrewvirus
- Andromedavirus
- Annadreamyvirus
- Appavirus
- Apricotvirus
- Arawnvirus
- Armstrongvirus
- Ashduovirus
- Attisvirus
- Attoomivirus
- Audreyjarvisvirus
- Austintatiousvirus
- Avanivirus
- Bantamvirus
- Barnyardvirus
- Beceayunavirus
- Beetrevirus
- Behunavirus
- Bernalvirus
- Betterkatzvirus
- Bievrevirus
- Bingvirus
- Bowservirus
- Bridgettevirus
- Britbratvirus
- Bronvirus
- Brussowvirus
- Camtrevirus
- Casadabanvirus
- Cbastvirus
- Cecivirus
- Ceduovirus
- Ceetrepovirus
- Cequinquevirus
- Chenonavirus
- Cheoctovirus
- Chertseyvirus
- Chivirus
- Chunghsingvirus
- Cimpunavirus
- Cinunavirus
- Coetzeevirus
- Colunavirus
- Coralvirus
- Corndogvirus
- Cornievirus
- Coventryvirus
- Cronusvirus
- Cukevirus
- Daredevilvirus
- Decurrovirus
- Delepquintavirus
- Demosthenesvirus
- Detrevirus
- Deurplevirus
- Dhillonvirus
- Dinavirus
- Dismasvirus
- Doucettevirus
- Edenvirus
- Efquatrovirus
- Eiauvirus
- Eisenstarkvirus
- Elerivirus
- Emalynvirus
- Eyrevirus
- Fairfaxidumvirus
- Farahnazvirus
- Fattrevirus
- Feofaniavirus
- Fernvirus
- Fibralongavirus
- Fowlmouthvirus
- Franklinbayvirus
- Fremauxvirus
- Fromanvirus
- Gaiavirus
- Galaxyvirus
- Galunavirus
- Gamtrevirus
- Gesputvirus
- Getseptimavirus
- Ghobesvirus
- Gilesvirus
- Gillianvirus
- Gilsonvirus
- Glaedevirus
- Godonkavirus
- Goodmanvirus
- Gordonvirus
- Gordtnkvirus
- Gorganvirus
- Gorjumvirus
- Gustavvirus
- Halcyonevirus
- Hattifnattvirus
- Hedwigvirus
- Helsingorvirus
- Hiyaavirus
- Hnatkovirus
- Holosalinivirus
- Homburgvirus
- Hubeivirus
- Iaduovirus
- Ikedavirus
- Ilzatvirus
- Incheonvirus
- Indlulamithivirus
- Inhavirus
- Jacevirus
- Jarrellvirus
- Jenstvirus
- Jouyvirus
- Juiceboxvirus
- Junavirus
- Kairosalinivirus
- Kamchatkavirus
- Karimacvirus
- Kelleziovirus
- Kilunavirus
- Klementvirus
- Knuthellervirus
- Kojivirus
- Konstantinevirus
- Korravirus
- Kostyavirus
- Krampusvirus
- Kryptosalinivirus
- Kuleanavirus
- Labanvirus
- Lacnuvirus
- Lacusarxvirus
- Lafunavirus
- Lambdavirus
- Lambovirus
- Lanavirus
- Larmunavirus
- Laroyevirus
- Latrobevirus
- Leicestervirus
- Lentavirus
- Liebevirus
- Liefievirus
- Lillamyvirus
- Lokivirus
- Lomovskayavirus
- Luckybarnesvirus
- Luckytenvirus
- Lughvirus
- Lwoffvirus
- Magadivirus
- Majavirus
- Manhattanvirus
- Mapvirus
- Mardecavirus
- Marienburgvirus
- Marvinvirus
- Maxrubnervirus
- Mementomorivirus
- Metamorphoovirus
- Minunavirus
- Moineauvirus
- Montyvirus
- Mudcatvirus
- Mufasoctovirus
- Muminvirus
- Murrayvirus
- Nanhaivirus
- Nazgulvirus
- Neferthenavirus
- Nesevirus
- Nevevirus
- Nickievirus
- Nonanavirus
- Nyceiraevirus
- Oengusvirus
- Omegavirus
- Oneupvirus
- Orchidvirus
- Oshimavirus
- Pahexavirus
- Pamexvirus
- Pankowvirus
- Papyrusvirus
- Patiencevirus
- Pepyhexavirus
- Phifelvirus
- Picardvirus
- Pikminvirus
- Pleeduovirus
- Pleetrevirus
- Poushouvirus
- Predatorvirus
- Priunavirus
- Psavirus
- Psimunavirus
- Pulverervirus
- Questintvirus
- Quhwahvirus
- Radostvirus
- Raleighvirus
- Ravarandavirus
- Ravinvirus
- Rerduovirus
- Rigallicvirus
- Rimavirus
- Rockefellervirus
- Rockvillevirus
- Rogerhendrixvirus
- Ronaldovirus
- Roufvirus
- Rowavirus
- Ruthyvirus
- Samistivirus
- Samunavirus
- Samwavirus
- Sandinevirus
- Sanovirus
- Sansavirus
- Saphexavirus
- Sashavirus
- Sasvirus
- Saundersvirus
- Sawaravirus
- Scapunavirus
- Schnabeltiervirus
- Schubertvirus
- Seongbukvirus
- Septimatrevirus
- Seussvirus
- Sextaecvirus
- Skunavirus
- Slashvirus
- Sleepyheadvirus
- Smoothievirus
- Sonalivirus
- Soupsvirus
- Sourvirus
- Sozzivirus
- Sparkyvirus
- Spbetavirus
- Spizizenvirus
- Squashvirus
- Squirtyvirus
- Stanholtvirus
- Steinhofvirus
- Sukhumvitvirus
- Tandoganvirus
- Tankvirus
- Tantvirus
- Terapinvirus
- Teubervirus
- Thetabobvirus
- Tigunavirus
- Timquatrovirus
- Tinduovirus
- Titanvirus
- Tortellinivirus
- Triavirus
- Trigintaduovirus
- Trinavirus
- Trinevirus
- Triplejayvirus
- Unahavirus
- Uwajimavirus
- Vashvirus
- Vedamuthuvirus
- Vendettavirus
- Vhulanivirus
- Vidquintavirus
- Vieuvirus
- Vividuovirus
- Vojvodinavirus
- Waukeshavirus
- Wbetavirus
- Weaselvirus
- Whackvirus
- Whiteheadvirus
- Wildcatvirus
- Wilnyevirus
- Wizardvirus
- Woesvirus
- Woodruffvirus
- Xiamenvirus
- Xipdecavirus
- Yangvirus
- Yonseivirus
- Yuavirus
- Yvonnevirus
- Zetavirus
