= Yuavirus =

Virus classification
- (unranked): Virus
- Realm: Duplodnaviria
- Kingdom: Heunggongvirae
- Phylum: Uroviricota
- Class: Caudoviricetes
- Family: Mesyanzhinovviridae
- Subfamily: Rabinowitzvirinae
- Genus: Yuavirus

Genus of viruses

Yuavirus is a genus of viruses in the subfamily Rabinowitzvirinae, family Mesyanzhinovviridae. Bacteria serve as the natural host, with transmission achieved through passive diffusion. There are five species in this genus.

== Taxonomy ==
The genus contains the following species:

- Yuavirus LKO4
- Yuavirus M6
- Yuavirus MP1412
- Yuavirus PAE1
- Yuavirus yua

== Structure ==
Yuaviruses are nonenveloped, with a head and tail. The head is a prolate spheroid about 72 nm by 51 nm. The tail is about 145 nm long.

Taxonomy	Structure	Symmetry	Capsid	Genomic arrangement	Genomic segmentation
Group I > Caudovirales > Siphoviridae > Yuavirus	Head-Tail	T=7	Non-enveloped	Linear	Monopartite

== Genome ==
All species have been fully sequenced. They range between 58-64k nucleotides, with 77-90 proteins.

== Life cycle ==
The virus attaches to the host cell using its terminal fibers, and ejects the viral DNA into the host periplasm. The DNA genome is circularized or integrate into the host's chromosome before transcription and translation. Once the viral genes have been replicated, the new virions are assembled in the cytoplasm. Finally, the mature virions are released via lysis.

Taxonomy	Host details	Tissue tropism	Entry details	Release details	Replication site	Assembly site	Transmission
Group I > Caudovirales > Siphoviridae > Yuavirus	Bacteria	None	Injection	Lysis	Cytoplasm	Cytoplasm	Passive diffusion

== History ==
According to ICTV's 2012 report, the genus was accepted under the name Yualikevirus, assigned to family Siphoviridae, order Caudovirales. The genus was later renamed to Yuavirus in 2016.
