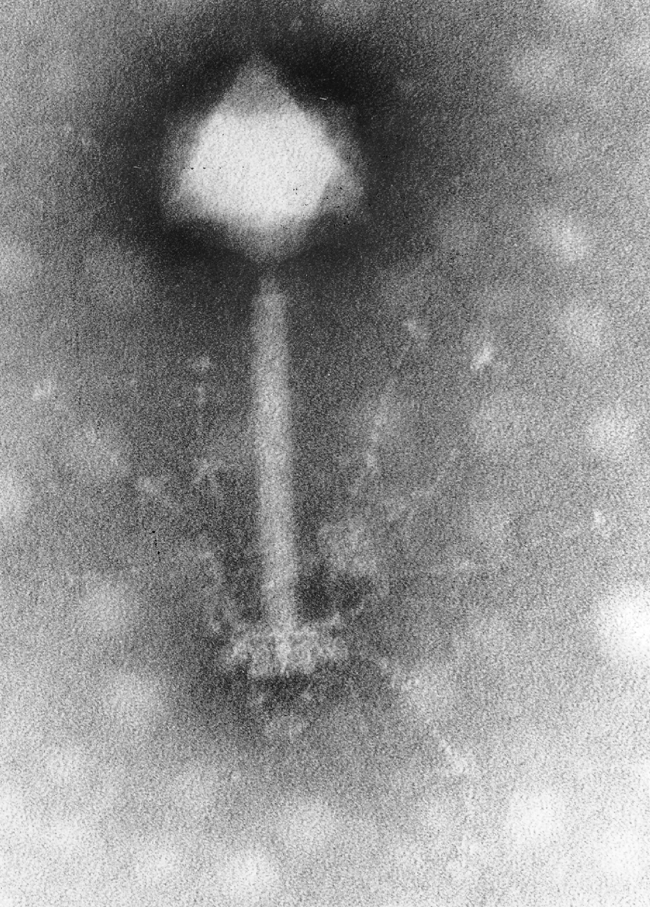
- TEM Image of a Synechococcus Phage S-PM2 virion

Virus classification
- (unranked): Virus
- Realm: Duplodnaviria
- Kingdom: Heunggongvirae
- Phylum: Uroviricota
- Class: Caudoviricetes
- Order: Caudovirales (abolished 2021)
- Family: Myoviridae

Subfamilies and genera
- See text

= Myoviridae =

Family of viruses

Myoviridae was a family of bacteriophages in the order Caudovirales. The family Myoviridae and order Caudovirales have now been abolished, with the term myovirus now used to refer to the morphology of viruses in this former family. Bacteria and archaea serve as natural hosts. There were 625 species in this family, assigned to eight subfamilies and 217 genera.

== Subdivisions ==
The subfamily Tevenvirinae (synonym: Tequatrovirinae) is named after its type species Enterobacteria phage T4. Members of this subfamily are morphologically indistinguishable and have moderately elongated heads of about 110 nanometers (nm) in length, 114 nm long tails with a collar, base plates with short spikes and six long kinked tail fibres. The genera within this subfamily are divided on the basis of head morphology with the genus Tequatrovirus (Provisional name: T4virus) having a head length of 137 nm and those in the genus Schizotequatrovirus being 111 nm in length. Within the genera on the basis of protein homology the species have been divided into a number of groups.

The subfamily Peduovirinae has virions with heads of 60 nm in diameter and tails of 135 × 18 nm. These phages are easily identified because contracted sheaths tend to slide off the tail core. The P" phage is the type species.

The subfamily Spounavirinae are all virulent, broad-host range phages that infect members of the Bacillota. They possess isometric heads of 87-94 nm in diameter and conspicuous capsomers, striated 140-219 nm long tails and a double base plate. At the tail tip are globular structures now known to be the base plate spikes and short kinked tail fibres with six-fold symmetry. Members of this group usually possess large (127–142 kb) nonpermuted genomes with 3.1–20 kb terminal redundancies. The name for this subfamily is derived from SPO plus una (Latin for one).

The haloviruses HF1 and HF2 belong to the same genus but since they infect archaea rather than bacteria, they are likely to be placed in a separate genus once their classification has been settled.

A dwarf group has been proposed on morphological and genomic grounds. This group includes the phages Aeromonas salmonicida phage 56, Vibrio cholerae phages 138 and CP-T1, Bdellovibrio phage φ1422 and Pectobacterium carotovorum phage ZF40. Their shared characteristics include an identical virion morphology, characterized by usually short contractile tails and all have genome sizes of approximately 45 kilobases. The gene order in the structural unit of the genome is in the order: terminase—portal—head—tail—base plate—tail fibers.

== Virology ==
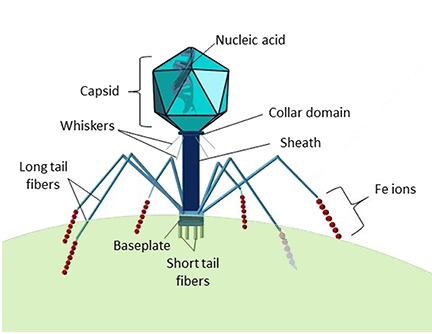
Typical structure of a myovirus

Viruses in the former family Myoviridae are non-enveloped, with head-tail (with a neck) geometries. Genomes are linear, double-stranded DNA, around 33-244kb in length. The genome codes for 40 to 415 proteins. It has terminally redundant sequences. The GC-content is ~35%. The genome encodes 200-300 proteins that are transcribed in operons. 5-Hydroxymethylcytosine may be present in the genome (instead of thymidine).

The tubular tail has helical symmetry and is 16-20 nm in diameter. It consists of a central tube, a contractile sheath, a collar, a base plate, six tail pins and six long fibres. It is similar to Tectiviridae, but differs in the fact that the tail of a myovirus is permanent.

Contractions of the tail require ATP. On contraction of the sheath, sheath subunits slide over each other and the tail shortens to 10–15 nm in length.

== Life cycle ==
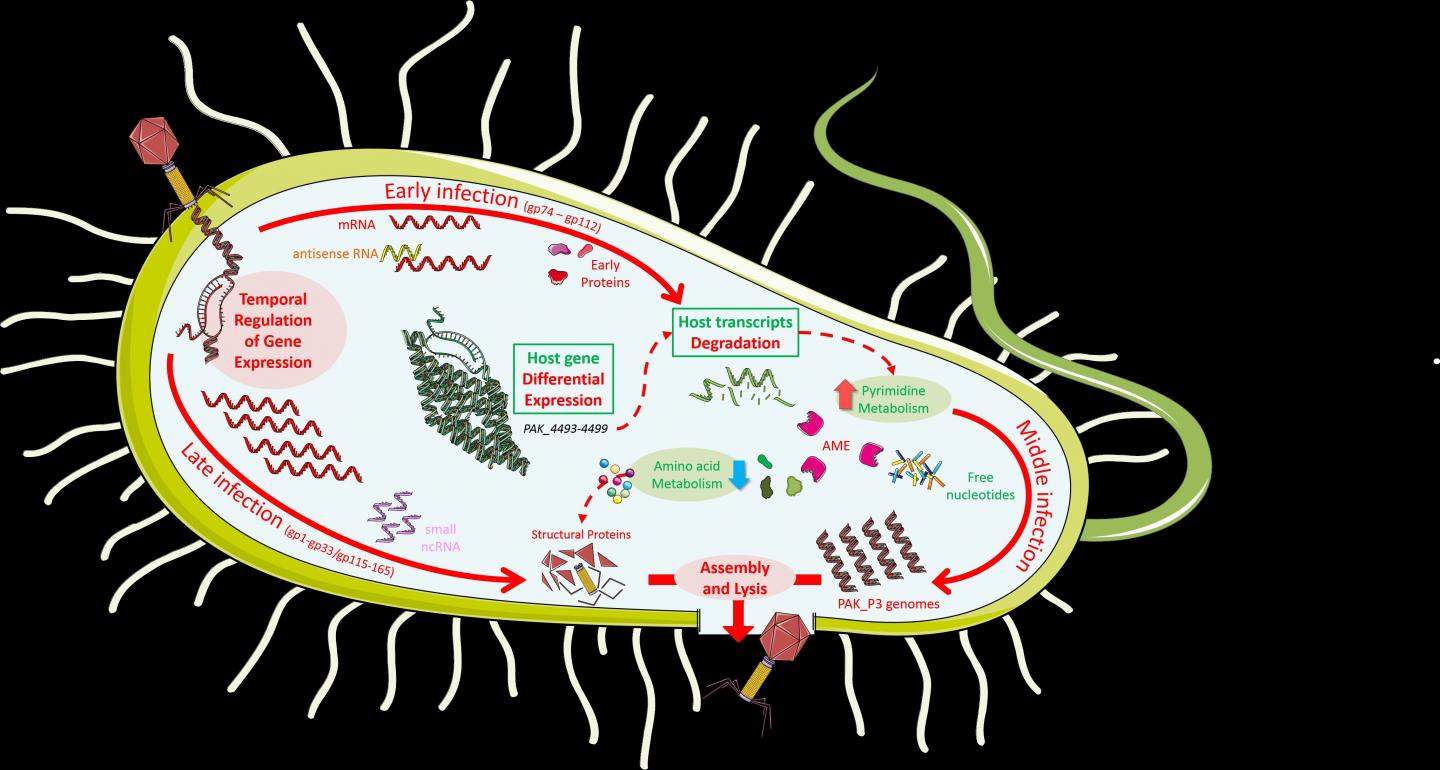
Reproduction cycle of Pseudomonas bacteriophage PAK_P3, genus Nankokuvirus

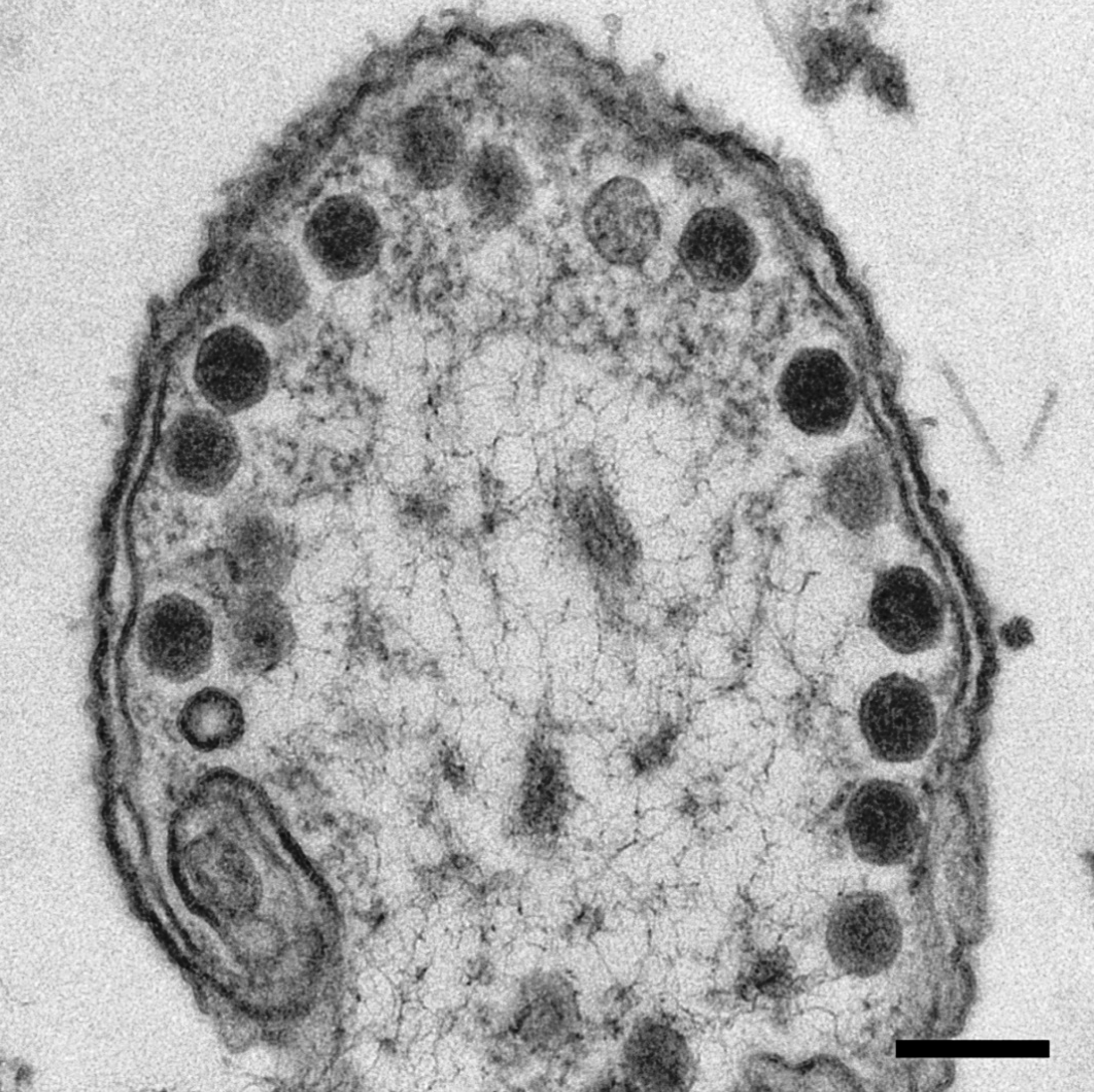
Micrograph of a plastic thin section of a Salmonella cell with Phage SPN3US capsids lined up at the cell membrane. Scale bar: 2000 Å. Credit: J. Bernard Heymann et al. (2020)

On attaching to a host cell, the virus uses its contractile sheath like a syringe, piercing the cell wall with its central tube and injecting the genetic material into the host. The injected DNA takes over the host cell's mechanisms for transcription and translation and begins to manufacture new viruses. Replication follows the replicative transposition model. DNA-templated transcription is the method of transcription. Translation takes place by -1 ribosomal frameshifting. The virus exits the host cell by lysis, and holin/endolysin/spanin proteins. Bacteria and archaea serve as the natural host. Transmission route is passive diffusion.

Although Myoviruses are in general lytic, lacking the genes required to become lysogenic, a number of temperate species are known.

== Applications ==
Most Myoviridae are lytic rather than temperate phages. Therefore, some researchers have investigated their use as a therapy for bacterial diseases in humans and other animals.

== Taxonomy ==
The following eight subfamilies are recognized:

- Ceeclamvirinae
- Emmerichvirinae
- Eucampyvirinae
- Gorgonvirinae
- Ounavirinae
- Peduovirinae
- Tevenvirinae
- Twarogvirinae
- Vequintavirinae

Additionally, the following genera are unassigned to a subfamily:

- Abouovirus
- Acionnavirus
- Agricanvirus
- Ahtivirus
- Alcyoneusvirus
- Alexandravirus
- Anamdongvirus
- Anaposvirus
- Aokuangvirus
- Asteriusvirus
- Atlauavirus
- Aurunvirus
- Ayohtrevirus
- Baikalvirus
- Bakolyvirus
- Barbavirus
- Bcepfunavirus
- Bcepmuvirus
- Becedseptimavirus
- Bellamyvirus
- Bendigovirus
- Biquartavirus
- Borockvirus
- Brigitvirus
- Brizovirus
- Brunovirus
- Busanvirus
- Carpasinavirus
- Chakrabartyvirus
- Charybdisvirus
- Chiangmaivirus
- Colneyvirus
- Cymopoleiavirus
- Derbicusvirus
- Dibbivirus
- Donellivirus
- Elmenteitavirus
- Elvirus
- Emdodecavirus
- Eneladusvirus
- Eponavirus
- Erskinevirus
- Eurybiavirus
- Ficleduovirus
- Flaumdravirus
- Fukuivirus
- Gofduovirus
- Goslarvirus
- Haloferacalesvirus
- Hapunavirus
- Heilongjiangvirus
- Iapetusvirus
- Iodovirus
- Ionavirus
- Jedunavirus
- Jilinvirus
- Jimmervirus
- Kanagawavirus
- Kanaloavirus
- Klausavirus
- Kleczkowskavirus
- Kungbxnavirus
- Kylevirus
- Lagaffevirus
- Leucotheavirus
- Libanvirus
- Lietduovirus
- Llyrvirus
- Loughboroughvirus
- Lubbockvirus
- Machinavirus
- Marfavirus
- Marthavirus
- Mazuvirus
- Menderavirus
- Metrivirus
- Mieseafarmvirus
- Mimasvirus
- Moabitevirus
- Moturavirus
- Muldoonvirus
- Mushuvirus
- Muvirus
- Myoalterovirus
- Myohalovirus
- Myosmarvirus
- Naesvirus
- Namakavirus
- Nankokuvirus
- Neptunevirus
- Nereusvirus
- Nerrivikvirus
- Nodensvirus
- Noxifervirus
- Nylescharonvirus
- Obolenskvirus
- Otagovirus
- Pakpunavirus
- Palaemonvirus
- Pbunavirus
- Peatvirus
- Pemunavirus
- Petsuvirus
- Phabquatrovirus
- Phapecoctavirus
- Phikzvirus
- Pippivirus
- Plaisancevirus
- Plateaulakevirus
- Polybotosvirus
- Pontusvirus
- Popoffvirus
- Punavirus
- Qingdaovirus
- Rahariannevirus
- Radnorvirus
- Ripduovirus
- Risingsunvirus
- Ronodorvirus
- Rosemountvirus
- Saclayvirus
- Saintgironsvirus
- Salacisavirus
- Salmondvirus
- Sarumanvirus
- Sasquatchvirus
- Schmittlotzvirus
- Seoulvirus
- Shandongvirus
- Sherbrookevirus
- Shirahamavirus
- Shalavirus
- Svunavirus
- Tabernariusvirus
- Takahashivirus
- Tamkungvirus
- Taranisvirus
- Tefnutvirus
- Tegunavirus
- Thaumasvirus
- Thetisvirus
- Thornevirus
- Tijeunavirus
- Toutatisvirus
- Tulanevirus
- Vellamovirus
- Vhmlvirus
- Vibakivirus
- Wellingtonvirus
- Wifcevirus
- Winklervirus
- Yokohamavirus
- Yoloswagvirus
- Yongloolinvirus
