= Vibrio virus K139 =

Longwoodvirus K139

Virus classification
- (unranked): Virus
- Realm: Duplodnaviria
- Kingdom: Heunggongvirae
- Phylum: Uroviricota
- Class: Caudoviricetes
- Order: Caudovirales (abolished 2021)
- Family: Myoviridae
- Genus: Longwoodvirus
- Species: Longwoodvirus K139

Strains
- Vibrio virus Kappa; Vibrio virus K139

Vibrio virus K139 is a bacteriophage (a virus that infects bacteria) of the family Peduoviridae, genus Longwoodvirus.
