= Myohalovirus =

Virus classification
- (unranked): Virus
- Realm: Duplodnaviria
- Kingdom: Heunggongvirae
- Phylum: Uroviricota
- Class: Caudoviricetes
- Family: Vertoviridae
- Genus: Myohalovirus

Genus of viruses

Myohalovirus (synonym: PhiH-like viruses, Phihlikevirus) is a genus of viruses in the class Caudoviricetes, in the family Vertoviridae. Bacteria and archaea serve as natural hosts. There are two species in this genus.

== Taxonomy ==
The genus contains the following species:

- Myohalovirus alkaliphilum
- Myohalovirus spontanei

== Structure ==
Myohaloviruses are nonenveloped, with a head and tail. The head is icosahedral with a diameter of about 64 nm. The tail is around 170 nm long, 18 nm wide, has short terminal fibers, and is contractile.

Genus	Structure	Symmetry	Capsid	Genomic arrangement	Genomic segmentation
Myohalovirus	Head-Tail		Non-enveloped	Linear	Monopartite

== Genome ==
Genomes are circular, around 59kb in length. The genome codes for 100 proteins.

== Life cycle ==
Viral replication is cytoplasmic. The virus attaches to the host cell using its terminal fibers, and ejects the viral DNA into the host cytoplasm via contraction of its tail sheath. DNA-templated transcription is the method of transcription. Once the viral genes have been replicated, the procapsid is assembled and packed. The tail is then assembled and the mature virions are released via lysis. Bacteria and archaea serve as the natural host. Transmission routes are passive diffusion.

Genus	Host details	Tissue tropism	Entry details	Release details	Replication site	Assembly site	Transmission
Myohalovirus	Bacteria; archea	None	Injection	Lysis	Cytoplasm	Cytoplasm	Passive diffusion

== History ==
According to the ICTV's 1997 report, the genus PhiH-like viruses was first accepted as a new genus in the family Myoviridae, at the same time as its type species. This proposal is available here. The following year (1998), the genus was added to the newly created order Caudovirales. In 1999, a name change is reported, but no change actually occurred. In 2012, the name was changed to Phihlikevirus. This proposal is available here. The genus was later renamed to Myohalovirus.
