= Lomovskayavirus =

Virus classification
- (unranked): Virus
- Realm: Duplodnaviria
- Kingdom: Heunggongvirae
- Phylum: Uroviricota
- Class: Caudoviricetes
- Family: Colingsworthviridae
- Genus: Lomovskayavirus

Genus of viruses

Lomovskayavirus (synonym PhiC31-like viruses, Phic31likevirus) is a genus of viruses in the family Colingsworthviridae. Bacteria serve as natural hosts. There are three species in this genus.

== Taxonomy ==
The following species are recognized:

- Lomovskayavirus BT1
- Lomovskayavirus C31
- Lomovskayavirus shawty

== Structure ==
Lomovskayaviruses are nonenveloped, with a head and tail. The head is about 53 nm in diameter, consisting of 72 capsomers. The tail is long and flexible, at about 100 nm long, 5 nm wide, has a 15 nm wide baseplate and four tail fibers ended by terminal knobs.

Genus	Structure	Symmetry	Capsid	Genomic arrangement	Genomic segmentation
Lomovskayavirus	Head-Tail	T=7	Non-enveloped	Linear	Monopartite

== Genome ==
The species have been fully sequenced. They have about 41-42k nucleotides, with 53 and 55 proteins.

== Life cycle ==
Viral replication is cytoplasmic. The virus attaches to the host cell's adhesion receptors using its terminal fibers, and ejects the viral DNA into the host cytoplasm via long flexible tail ejection system. Replication follows the replicative transposition model. DNA-templated transcription is the method of transcription. Once the viral genes have been replicated, the procapsid is assembled and packed. The tail is then assembled and the mature virions are released via lysis. Bacteria serve as the natural host. Transmission routes are passive diffusion.

Genus	Host details	Tissue tropism	Entry details	Release details	Replication site	Assembly site	Transmission
Lomovskayavirus	Bacteria	None	Injection	Lysis	Cytoplasm	Cytoplasm	Passive diffusion

== History ==
According to ICTV, the genus Phic3unalikevirus was first accepted under the name PhiC31-like viruses in 2004, assigned to family Siphoviridae in order Caudovirales. In 2012, the genus was renamed to Phic3unalikevirus. The genus was later renamed to Lomovskayavirus.
