= Psimunavirus =

Virus classification
- (unranked): Virus
- Realm: Duplodnaviria
- Kingdom: Heunggongvirae
- Phylum: Uroviricota
- Class: Caudoviricetes
- Order: Methanobavirales
- Family: Leisingerviridae
- Genus: Psimunavirus

Genus of viruses

Psimunavirus (synonyms psiM-like viruses, psiM1-like viruses, Psimunalikevirus) is a genus of viruses in the family Leisingerviridae. Bacteria and archaea serve as the natural host, with transmission achieved through passive diffusion. There is only one species in this genus: Psimunavirus limi.

== Structure ==
Psimunaviruses are nonenveloped, with a head and tail. The head is about 55 nm in diameter. The tail is long and flexible, at about 210 nm long, 10 nm wide, and has a terminal knob.

| Genus | Structure | Symmetry | Capsid | Genomic arrangement | Genomic segmentation |
|---|---|---|---|---|---|
| Psimunavirus | Head-Tail | T=7 | Non-enveloped | Linear | Monopartite |

== Genome ==
Psimunavirus is currently unlisted by NCBI.

== Life cycle ==
Viral replication is cytoplasmic. The virus attaches to the host cell's adhesion receptors using its terminal fibers, and ejects the viral DNA into the host cytoplasm via long flexible tail ejection system. Replication follows the replicative transposition model. DNA-templated transcription is the method of transcription. Once the viral genes have been replicated, the procapsid is assembled and packed. The tail is then assembled and the mature virions are released via lysis. Bacteria and archaea serve as the natural host. Transmission routes are passive diffusion.

| Genus | Host details | Tissue tropism | Entry details | Release details | Replication site | Assembly site | Transmission |
|---|---|---|---|---|---|---|---|
| Psimunavirus | Bacteria; archea | None | Injection | Lysis | Cytoplasm | Cytoplasm | Passive diffusion |

== History ==
According to ICTV's 1997 report, the genus Psimunalikevirus was first accepted under the name psiM-like viruses, assigned only to family Siphoviridae. The whole family was moved to the newly created order Caudovirales in 1998, and the genus was renamed to psiM1-like viruses in ICTV's seventh report in 1999. In 2012, the genus was renamed again, this time to Psimunalikevirus. The genus was later renamed to Psimunavirus in 2016.
