= Naesvirus =

Virus classification
- (unranked): Virus
- Realm: Duplodnaviria
- Kingdom: Heunggongvirae
- Phylum: Uroviricota
- Class: Caudoviricetes
- Genus: Naesvirus

Genus of viruses

Naesvirus is a genus of viruses in the class Caudoviricetes. Bacteria serve as the natural host, with transmission achieved through passive diffusion. There are four species in this genus.

== Taxonomy ==
Species:

- Naesvirus bcep1
- Naesvirus bcep43
- Naesvirus bcep781
- Naesvirus bcepNY3

== Structure ==
Naesviruses are nonenveloped, with a head and tail.

== Genome ==
All five species have been fully sequenced and are available from ICTV. They range between 46k and 49k nucleotides, with 62 to 71 proteins. The complete genomes are available from here.

== Life cycle ==
The virus attaches to the host cell using its terminal fibers, and ejects the viral DNA into the host cytoplasm via contraction of its tail sheath. Once the viral genes have been replicated, the procapsid is assembled and packed. The tail is then assembled and the mature virions are released via lysis.

== History ==
According to the ICTV's 2010–11 report, the genus Naesvirus was first accepted as a new genus, at the same time as all five of its contained species. This proposal is available here.
