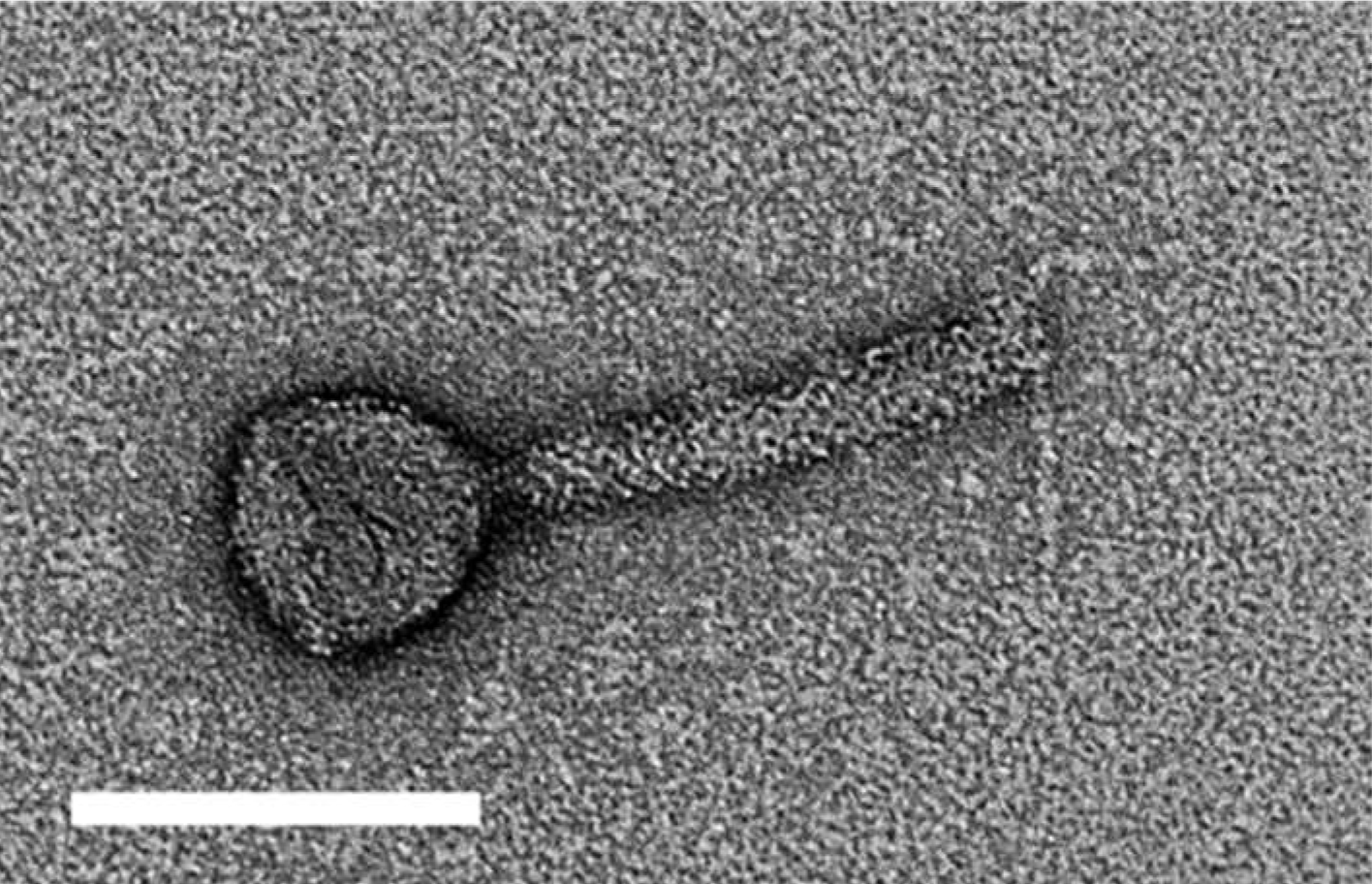

Virus classification
- (unranked): Virus
- Realm: Duplodnaviria
- Kingdom: Heunggongvirae
- Phylum: Uroviricota
- Class: Caudoviricetes
- Family: Lindbergviridae
- Genus: Pbunavirus

= Pbunavirus =

Genus of viruses

Pbunavirus (synonyms: Pb1likevirus, Pbunalikevirus) is a genus of viruses in the family Lindbergviridae. Bacteria serve as natural hosts. There are 45 species in this genus.

== Taxonomy ==
The following species are recognized:

- Pbunavirus Ab28
- Pbunavirus antinowhere
- Pbunavirus BrSP1
- Pbunavirus crassa
- Pbunavirus datas
- Pbunavirus DL60
- Pbunavirus DL68
- Pbunavirus DP1
- Pbunavirus E215
- Pbunavirus E217
- Pbunavirus Epa7
- Pbunavirus Epa14
- Pbunavirus EPa61
- Pbunavirus F8
- Pbunavirus FBPa14
- Pbunavirus FBPa35
- Pbunavirus JG024
- Pbunavirus KPP12
- Pbunavirus KTN6
- Pbunavirus LBL3
- Pbunavirus LMA2
- Pbunavirus LS1
- Pbunavirus NH4
- Pbunavirus PA01
- Pbunavirus PA5
- Pbunavirus Pa193
- Pbunavirus PA8P1
- Pbunavirus PaGU11
- Pbunavirus PB1
- Pbunavirus ph0031
- Pbunavirus PS44
- Pbunavirus PSA09
- Pbunavirus PSA25
- Pbunavirus pv109
- Pbunavirus pv141
- Pbunavirus R12
- Pbunavirus R26
- Pbunavirus S1
- Pbunavirus SG1
- Pbunavirus SL1
- Pbunavirus SN
- Pbunavirus TH15
- Pbunavirus USP1
- Pbunavirus victoria
- Pbunavirus wadjak13

== Structure ==
Pbunaviruses are nonenveloped, with a head and tail. The head has a diameter of about 75 nm. The tail is around 140 nm long displaying a criss-cross pattern, has a small baseplate, and is contractile.

Genus	Structure	Symmetry	Capsid	Genomic arrangement	Genomic segmentation
Pbunavirus	Head-Tail		Non-enveloped	Linear	Monopartite

== Genome ==
Genomes are linear, around 65-75kb in length. The genome codes for 90 to 130 proteins. Some species have been fully sequenced and are available from ICTV. They range between 64k and 73k nucleotides, with 88 to 127 proteins. The complete genomes are available from here.

== Life cycle ==
Viral replication is cytoplasmic. The virus attaches to the host cell using its terminal fibers, and ejects the viral DNA into the host cytoplasm via contraction of its tail sheath. DNA-templated transcription is the method of transcription. Once the viral genes have been replicated, the procapsid is assembled and packed. The tail is then assembled and the mature virions are released via lysis. Bacteria serve as the natural host. Transmission routes are passive diffusion.

Genus	Host details	Tissue tropism	Entry details	Release details	Replication site	Assembly site	Transmission
Pbunavirus	Bacteria	None	Injection	Lysis	Cytoplasm	Cytoplasm	Passive diffusion

== History ==
According to the ICTV's 2010–11 report, the genus Pb1likevirus was first accepted as a new genus, at the same time as all of its contained species. This proposal is available here. The following year (2012), the name was changed to Pbunalikevirus. This proposal is available here. The genus was later renamed to Pbunavirus.
