= K139 =

K139 or K-139 may refer to:

- K-139 (Kansas highway), a state highway in Kansas
- HMCS Moncton (K139), a former Canadian Navy ship
- Vibrio virus K139, a virus
- Mass in C minor, K. 139 "Waisenhaus"
