= Spbetavirus =

Virus classification
- (unranked): Virus
- Realm: Duplodnaviria
- Kingdom: Heunggongvirae
- Phylum: Uroviricota
- Class: Caudoviricetes
- Genus: Spbetavirus

Synonyms
- Spbetalikevirus; Bacillus phage SPbeta

Genus of viruses

Spbetavirus (formerly Spbetalikevirus and sometimes SPbeta-like viruses) is a genus of viruses in the class Caudoviricetes. Bacteria serve as natural hosts. There is only one species in this genus: Spbetavirus SPbeta.

== Structure ==
Spbetaviruses are nonenveloped, with a head and tail. The head is about 81 nm in diameter. The tail is long, but fairly rigid, at about 355 nm long, 10 nm wide. It has six club-shaped terminal fibers and no collar.

Genus	Structure	Symmetry	Capsid	Genomic arrangement	Genomic segmentation
Spbetavirus	Head-Tail	T=7	Non-enveloped	Linear	Monopartite

== Genome ==
Genomes are linear, around 134kb in length. Bacillus phage SPbeta has been fully sequenced. It has about 134k nucleotides, with 185 proteins. The complete genome is available here

== Life cycle ==
Viral replication is cytoplasmic. The virus attaches to the host cell's adhesion receptors using its terminal fiber, and degrades the cell wall using viral exolysin enough to eject the viral DNA into the host cytoplasm via long flexible tail ejection system. Replication follows the replicative transposition model. DNA-templated transcription is the method of transcription. Once the viral genes have been replicated, the procapsid is assembled and packed. The tail is then assembled and the mature virions are released via lysis. Bacteria serve as the natural host. Transmission routes are passive diffusion.

Genus	Host details	Tissue tropism	Entry details	Release details	Replication site	Assembly site	Transmission
Spbetavirus	Bacteria	None	Injection	Lysis	Cytoplasm	Cytoplasm	Passive diffusion

== History ==
According to ICTV's ninth report, the genus Spbetalikevirus was first accepted under the name SPbeta-like viruses, assigned to family Siphoviridae, order Caudovirales. The genus was first renamed to Spbetalikevirus in 2012, and later to Spbetavirus in 2015.
