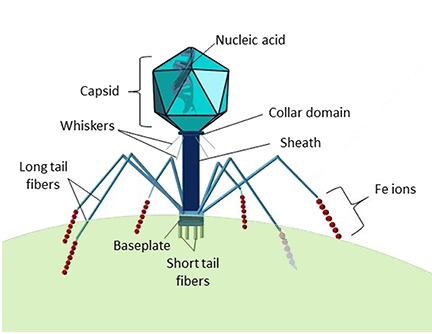
- Myoviridae bacteriophage

Virus classification
- (unranked): Virus
- Realm: Duplodnaviria
- Kingdom: Heunggongvirae
- Phylum: Uroviricota
- Class: Caudoviricetes
- Family: Connertonviridae
- Genus: Fletchervirus

= Fletchervirus =

Genus of viruses

Fletchervirus is a genus of virus of the family Connertonviridae. This genus contains 13 species. Viruses in the genus infect bacteria of the genus Campylobacter. Fletchervirus like most bacterial viruses (bacteriophages) are harmless to humans and thus have no antiviral drugs associated with them. They can be found worldwide and just like most bacteriophage species are found in almost all ecological environments including humans.

== Comparative morphology ==
Fletchervirus differs from its sibling (Firehammervirus) genus morphologically. Members of the genus have heads with a larger diameter and tails that are far shorter. For example, the species Fletchervirus CP81 in the Fletchervirus genus has a head with 96 nm diameter, and a 97 nm long tail, whereas Campylobacter virus CP220 in the Firehammervirus genus has a head with a 93 nm diameter and a 140 nm long tail.

Genetically, members of Fletchervirus have a smaller genome that codes for less proteins, they dsDNA is also permuted circularly. Whereas, members of Firehammervirus have a larger genome with more proteins and a liner permuted dsDNA complex. For example, Fletchervirus CP81 has a genome of 132 kb that codes for 149 proteins versus Campylobacter virus CP220 that has a genome 197 kb that codes for 257 proteins.

== Host and phage therapy ==
Campylobacter is a[genus of Gram-negative bacteria. It is found mostly in raw meats, and if consumed can be a terrible pathogen for humans often causing diarrhea, cramps, fever and pain. Bacteriophage therapy is a growing research field, particularly in many species of Campylobacter. Fletcherviruses have been specifically and promisingly tested for medical use to fight strands of antibiotic resistant Campylobacter.

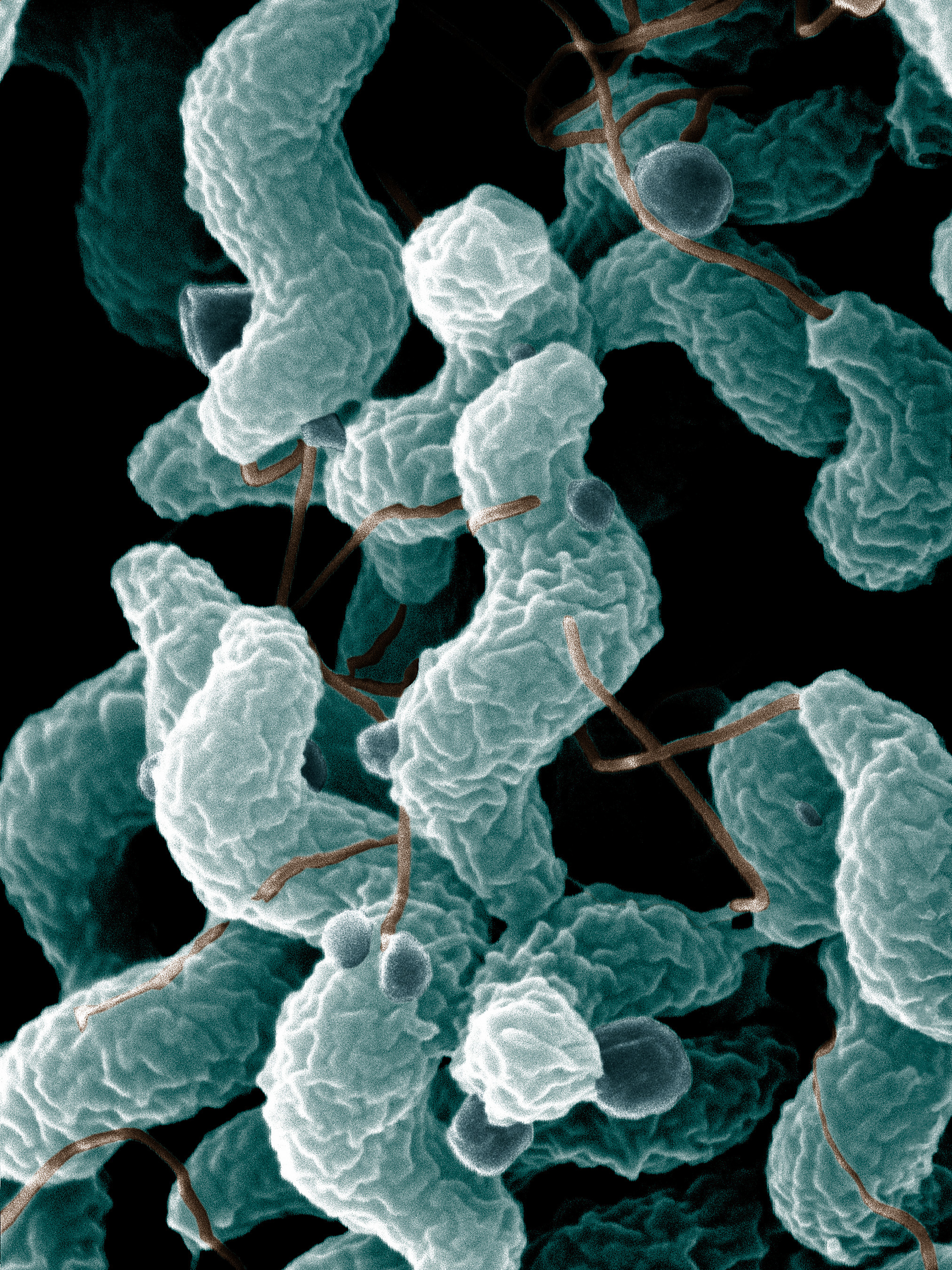
Campylobacter jejuni

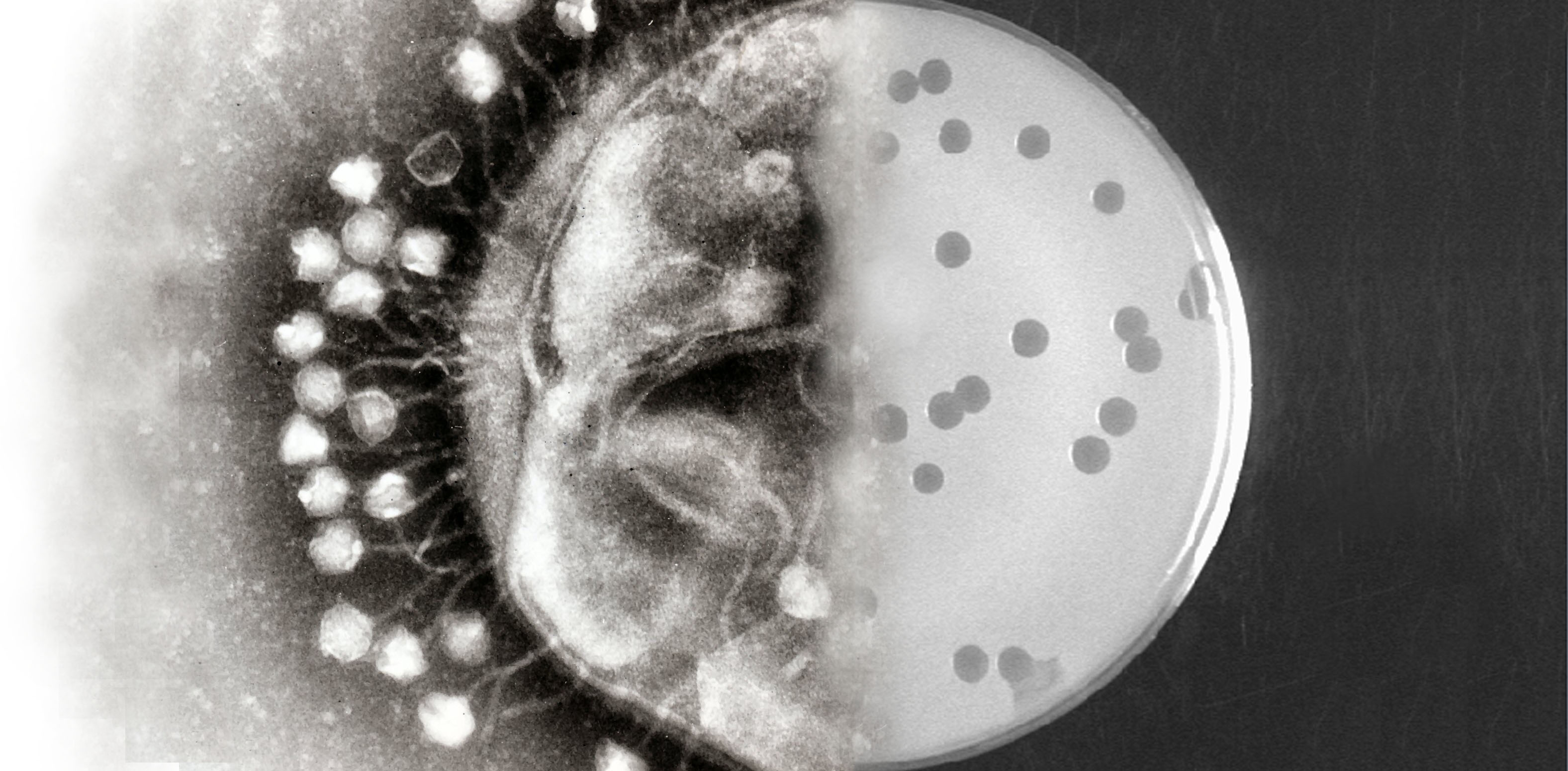
Bacteriophages taking over host.

== Taxonomy ==
The genus contains the following species:

- Fletchervirus CJLB7
- Fletchervirus CJLB10
- Fletchervirus CP81
- Fletchervirus CP30A
- Fletchervirus CPX
- Fletchervirus F207
- Fletchervirus F336
- Fletchervirus F341
- Fletchervirus F372
- Fletchervirus Los1
- Fletchervirus NCTC12673
- Fletchervirus PC5
- Fletchervirus QDYZ
