= Mu-gpT-DE RNA motif =

Mu-gpT-DE
- Consensus secondary structure and sequence conservation of Mu-gpT-DE RNA

Identifiers
- Symbol: Mu-gpT-DE
- Rfam: RF03012

Other data
- RNA type: Gene; sRNA
- SO: SO:0001263
- PDB structures: PDBe

The Mu-like gpT Downstream Element RNA motif (Mu-gpT-DE RNA motif) is a conserved RNA structure that was discovered by bioinformatics. The Mu-gpT-DE motif is only found in metagenomic sequences arising from unknown organisms.

Mu-gpT-DE RNAs usually occur downstream of genes whose protein products are similar to gpT. gpT is a protein subunit of the phage head of phages similar to Bacteriophage Mu. This and other observations suggest that Mu-gpT-DE RNAs are found in phages and prophages. Some Mu-gpT-DE RNAs contain a stem that overlaps the Shine-Dalgarno sequence of the downstream gene, which could suggest a cis-regulatory function. However, this phenomenon could also arise if Mu-gpT-DE RNAs are part of a tightly packed genome, as is common with phages. Thus, Mu-gpT-DE RNAs might function as small RNAs.
