= Muvirus =

Virus classification
- (unranked): Virus
- Realm: Duplodnaviria
- Kingdom: Heunggongvirae
- Phylum: Uroviricota
- Class: Caudoviricetes
- Genus: Muvirus

Genus of viruses

Muvirus (synonyms: Mu-like phages, Mu-like viruses, Mulikevirus) is a genus of viruses in the class Caudoviricetes. Bacteria serve as natural hosts, with transmission achieved through passive diffusion. There are two species in this genus.

== Taxonomy ==
The following two species are assigned to the genus:

- Muvirus mu (bacteriophage Mu)
- Muvirus SfMu

== Structure ==
Muviruses are nonenveloped, with a head and tail. The head has an icosahedral structure of about 54 nm in width. The neck is knob-like, and the tail is contractile with a base plate and six short terminal fibers.

| Genus | Structure | Symmetry | Capsid | Genomic arrangement | Genomic segmentation |
|---|---|---|---|---|---|
| Muvirus | Head-Tail | | Non-enveloped | Linear | Monopartite |

== Genome ==
Escherichia virus Mu has been fully sequenced and is available from ICTV. It has 36k nucleotides, with 55 proteins. Two similar, unclassified viruses are also sequenced. The complete genomes are available here.

== Life cycle ==
The virus attaches to the host cell lipopolysaccharides using its terminal fibers, and ejects the viral DNA into the host cytoplasm via contraction of its tail sheath. Once in the cell, the viral DNA is protected from degradation by the host nucleases. The viral DNA is then circularized and integrated into the host chromosome. The viral genome is copied 50–100 times in the host chromosome via replicative transposition. DNA-templated transcription is the method of transcription. Translation takes place by -1 ribosomal frameshifting. Once the viral genes have been replicated, the procapsid is assembled and packed. The tail is then assembled and the mature virions are released via lysis. Bacteria serve as the natural host. Transmission routes are passive diffusion.

| Genus | Host details | Tissue tropism | Entry details | Release details | Replication site | Assembly site | Transmission |
|---|---|---|---|---|---|---|---|
| Muvirus | Bacteria | None | Injection | Lysis | Cytoplasm | Cytoplasm | Passive diffusion |

== History ==
According to the ICTV's 1996 report, the genus Mu-like phages was first accepted as a new genus in the family Myoviridae, a year after its type species was recognized by the committee. In 1998, it was moved into the newly created order Caudovirales. The next year (1999), the name was changed to Mu-like viruses. Finally, in the 2010–11 report, it was renamed again to Mulikevirus. These reports (with the exception of 1998) are available online here: 1996, 1999, 2010. The genus was later renamed to Muvirus.
