= Bacteroidales-2 RNA motif =

Bacteroidales-2
- Consensus secondary structure and sequence conservation of Bacteroidales-2 RNA

Identifiers
- Symbol: Bacteroidales-2
- Rfam: RF02943

Other data
- RNA type: Gene; sRNA
- SO: SO:0001263
- PDB structures: PDBe

The Bacteroidales-2 RNA motif is a conserved RNA structure that was discovered by bioinformatics. Bacteroidales-2 motifs are found in Bacteroidales. Bacteroidales-2 RNAs likely function in trans as sRNAs.

Bacteroidales-2 RNAs are relatively large compared to most other bacterial sRNAs, averaging just over 400 nucleotides. Despite this large size, Bacteriodales-2 RNAs exhibit a relatively simple secondary structure, being composed mainly of hairpins.

Bacteroidales-2 RNAs often occur adjacent to large regions that do not appear to encode proteins. A possible weak association with Mu-like phages was proposed. The hairpin on the 3' end of the Bacteroidales-2 motif might function as a Rho-independent transcription terminator.
