= Eucampyvirinae =

Former subfamily of viruses

Eucampyvirinae was a subfamily of viruses. The subfamily was assigned to the class Caudoviricetes, with no intermediate taxa between the ranks of class and subfamily. The subfamily included the following genera, which were reassigned to the family Connertonviridae:

- Firehammervirus
- Fletchervirus
