= Ravinvirus =

Virus classification
- (unranked): Virus
- Realm: Duplodnaviria
- Kingdom: Heunggongvirae
- Phylum: Uroviricota
- Class: Caudoviricetes
- Genus: Ravinvirus

Genus of viruses

Ravinvirus (synonym N15-like viruses, N15likevirus) is a genus of viruses in the class Caudoviricetes. Bacteria serve as natural hosts, with transmission achieved through passive diffusion. There is only one species in this genus: Ravinvirus N15.

== Structure ==
Ravinviruses are nonenveloped, with a head and tail. The head is about 60 nm in diameter. The tail is long and flexible, at about 140 nm long, 8 nm wide, with short brush-like terminal fibers.

Genus	Structure	Symmetry	Capsid	Genomic arrangement	Genomic segmentation
Ravinvirus	Head-Tail	T=7	Non-enveloped	Linear	Monopartite

== Genome ==
Escherichia virus N15 has been fully sequenced. It has about 46k nucleotides, with 60 proteins. The complete genome is available here

== Life cycle ==
Viral replication is cytoplasmic. The virus attaches to the host cell's adhesion receptors using its terminal fiber, and ejects the viral DNA into the host cytoplasm via long flexible tail ejection system. Replication follows the replicative transposition model. DNA-templated transcription is the method of transcription. Once the viral genes have been replicated, the procapsid is assembled and packed. The tail is then assembled and the mature virions are released via lysis. Bacteria serve as the natural host. Transmission routes are passive diffusion.

Genus	Host details	Tissue tropism	Entry details	Release details	Replication site	Assembly site	Transmission
Ravinvirus	Bacteria	None	Injection	Lysis	Cytoplasm	Cytoplasm	Passive diffusion

== History ==
According to ICTV, the genus N15likevirus was first accepted under the name N15-like viruses in 2004, assigned to family Siphoviridae in order Caudovirales. In 2012, the genus was renamed to N15likevirus. The genus was later renamed to Ravinvirus in 2019.
