= Ceduovirus =

Virus classification
- (unranked): Virus
- Realm: Duplodnaviria
- Kingdom: Heunggongvirae
- Phylum: Uroviricota
- Class: Caudoviricetes
- Genus: Ceduovirus

Genus of viruses

Ceduovirus (synonyms c2-like viruses, c2-like phages, C2likevirus) is a genus of viruses in the class Caudoviricetes, unassigned to a family and order. Bacteria serve as the natural host, with transmission achieved through passive diffusion. There are 34 species in this genus.

== Taxonomy ==
The following species are recognized:

- Ceduovirus bIBB14
- Ceduovirus bIBBA3
- Ceduovirus bIBBAm4
- Ceduovirus bIBBE1
- Ceduovirus bIBBL12
- Ceduovirus bIBBp64
- Ceduovirus bIL67
- Ceduovirus blBB94p4
- Ceduovirus c2
- Ceduovirus CHPC116
- Ceduovirus CHPC122
- Ceduovirus CHPC966
- Ceduovirus CHPC967
- Ceduovirus CHPC972
- Ceduovirus CHPC1020
- Ceduovirus CHPC1170
- Ceduovirus CHPC1182
- Ceduovirus CHPC1183
- Ceduovirus CHPC1242
- Ceduovirus cv05802
- Ceduovirus cv20R03M
- Ceduovirus cv37203
- Ceduovirus cv50102
- Ceduovirus cv50504
- Ceduovirus cv5171F
- Ceduovirus cv62402
- Ceduovirus cv62403
- Ceduovirus cv62606
- Ceduovirus D4410
- Ceduovirus D4412
- Ceduovirus LacS15
- Ceduovirus M5938
- Ceduovirus PCB1
- Ceduovirus PCS1

== Structure ==
Ceduoviruses are nonenveloped, with a head and tail. The prolate head is about 56 nm long and 41 nm wide and has a collar. The tail is cross-banded, is about 86-111 nm long, 8 nm wide, and has short tail fibers. Genomes are linear, around 22kb in length.

| Genus | Structure | Symmetry | Capsid | Genomic arrangement | Genomic segmentation |
|---|---|---|---|---|---|
| Ceduovirus | Head-Tail | T=7 | Non-enveloped | Linear | Monopartite |

== Genome ==
Some species have been fully sequenced. They range between 22k and 23k nucleotides, with 37 to 39 proteins. Complete genomes are available here

== Life cycle ==
Viral replication is cytoplasmic. The virus attaches to the host cell's adhesion receptors using its terminal fibers, and viral exolysin degrades the cell wall enough to eject the viral DNA into the host cytoplasm via long flexible tail ejection system. Replication follows the DNA strand displacement, via replicative transposition model. DNA templated transcription is the method of transcription. Bacteria serve as the natural host. Transmission routes are passive diffusion.

| Genus | Host details | Tissue tropism | Entry details | Release details | Replication site | Assembly site | Transmission |
|---|---|---|---|---|---|---|---|
| Ceduovirus | Bacteria | None | Injection | Lysis | Cytoplasm | Cytoplasm | Passive diffusion |

== History ==
According to ICTV's 1996 report, the genus C2likevirus was first accepted under the name c2-like phages, assigned only to family Siphoviridae. The whole family was moved to the newly created order Caudovirales in 1998, and the genus was renamed to c2-like viruses in ICTV's seventh report in 1999. In 2012, the genus was renamed again, this time to C2likevirus. The genus was later renamed to Ceduovirus in 2018.
