= Hapunavirus =

Virus classification
- (unranked): Virus
- Realm: Duplodnaviria
- Kingdom: Heunggongvirae
- Phylum: Uroviricota
- Class: Caudoviricetes
- Genus: Hapunavirus

Genus of viruses

Hapunavirus (synonyms: Hap1likevirus and Hapunalikevirus) is a genus of viruses in the class Caudoviricetes. Bacteria serve as the natural host, with transmission achieved through passive diffusion. There are two species in this genus.

== Taxonomy ==
The following two species are assigned to the genus:

- Hapunavirus HAP1
- Hapunavirus VP882

== Structure ==
Hapunaviruses are nonenveloped, with a head and tail. The head has a diameter of about 50 nm. The tail is around 260 nm long, has a small baseplate, and is contractile.

== Genome ==
Both species have been fully sequenced and are available from ICTV. They range between 38k and 40k nucleotides, with 46 to 71 proteins. The complete genomes are available from here.

== Life cycle ==
The virus attaches to the host cell using its terminal fibers, and ejects the viral DNA into the host cytoplasm via contraction of its tail sheath. Once the viral genes have been replicated, the procapsid is assembled and packed. The tail is then assembled and the mature virions are released via lysis.

== History ==
According to the ICTV's 2010–11 report, the genus Hap1likevirus was first accepted as a new genus, at the same time as both of its contained species. This proposal is available here. The following year (2012), the name was changed to Hapunalikevirus. This proposal is available here. The genus was later renamed to Hapunavirus in 2016.
