= Mycobacterium virus Patience =

Virus classification
- (unranked): Virus
- Realm: Duplodnaviria
- Kingdom: Heunggongvirae
- Phylum: Uroviricota
- Class: Caudoviricetes
- Genus: Patiencevirus
- Species: Patiencevirus patience

Mycobacterium virus Patience, also called Patience, is a bacteriophage that infects Mycobacterium smegmatis bacteria. The large difference between the GC content of this virus's genome (50.3%) and that of its host (67.4%) indicate Patience likely evolved among bacteria of lower GC content but was able to infect M. smegmatis as well. It is the only species of the genus Patiencevirus.
