= Punavirus =

Virus classification
- (unranked): Virus
- Realm: Duplodnaviria
- Kingdom: Heunggongvirae
- Phylum: Uroviricota
- Class: Caudoviricetes
- Genus: Punavirus

Synonyms
- P1-like viruses; Punalikevirus

Genus of viruses

Punavirus is a genus of viruses in the class Caudoviricetes. Bacteria serve as natural hosts. There are four species in this genus.

== Taxonomy ==
The following four species are assigned to the genus:

- Punavirus P1
- Punavirus pv43
- Punavirus RCS47
- Punavirus SJ46

== Structure ==
Viruses in Punavirus are non-enveloped, with icosahedral and head-tail geometries. The diameter is around 85 nm. Genomes are circular, around 100kb in length. The genome codes for 100 proteins.

Genus	Structure	Symmetry	Capsid	Genomic arrangement	Genomic segmentation
Punavirus	Head-Tail		Non-enveloped	Circular	Monopartite

== Life cycle ==
Viral replication is cytoplasmic. Entry into the host cell is achieved by adsorption into the host cell. DNA-templated transcription is the method of transcription. Bacteria serve as the natural host. Transmission routes are passive diffusion.

Genus	Host details	Tissue tropism	Entry details	Release details	Replication site	Assembly site	Transmission
Punavirus	Bacteria	None	Injection	Lysis	Cytoplasm	Cytoplasm	Passive diffusion
