= Lubbockvirus =

Virus classification
- (unranked): Virus
- Realm: Duplodnaviria
- Kingdom: Heunggongvirae
- Phylum: Uroviricota
- Class: Caudoviricetes
- Genus: Lubbockvirus

Genus of viruses

Lubbockvirus is a genus of viruses in the class Caudoviricetes. Bacteria serve as the natural host, with transmission achieved through passive diffusion. There are two species in this genus.

== Taxonomy ==
The following two species are assigned to the genus:

- Lubbockvirus CD119
- Lubbockvirus CDHM19

== Structure ==
Lubbockviruses are nonenveloped, with a head and tail. The head has a diameter of about 50 nm. The tail is around 110 nm long, and is flexible and contractile.

== Genome ==
Some species have been fully sequenced and are available from ICTV. They range between 50k and 57k nucleotides, with 75 to 82 proteins. The complete genomes are available here.

== Life cycle ==
The virus attaches to the host cell using its terminal fibers, and ejects the viral DNA into the host cytoplasm via contraction of its tail sheath. Once the viral genes have been replicated, the procapsid is assembled and packed. The tail is then assembled and the mature virions are released via lysis.

== History ==
According to the ICTV's 2010–11 report, the genus PhiCD119likevirus was first accepted as a new genus, at the same time as all three of its contained species. This proposal is currently unavailable, as the link seems to be broken. The following year (2012), the name was changed to Phicd119likevirus. This proposal is available here. The genus was later renamed to Lubbockvirus in 2019.
