= Bacteriophage Mu =

Virus classification
- (unranked): Virus
- Realm: Duplodnaviria
- Kingdom: Heunggongvirae
- Phylum: Uroviricota
- Class: Caudoviricetes
- Genus: Muvirus
- Species: Muvirus mu

Synonyms
- Escherichia virus Mu

Species of virus

Bacteriophage Mu, also known as mu phage or mu bacteriophage, is a muvirus (the first of its kind to be identified) which has been shown to cause genetic transposition. It is of particular importance as its discovery in Escherichia coli by Larry Taylor was among the first observations of insertion elements in a genome. This discovery opened up the world to an investigation of transposable elements and their effects on a wide variety of organisms. While Mu was specifically involved in several distinct areas of research (including E. coli, maize, and HIV), the wider implications of transposition and insertion transformed the entire field of genetics.

== Anatomy ==
Phage Mu is nonenveloped, with a head and a tail. The head has an icosahedral structure of about 54 nm in width. The neck is knob-like, and the tail is contractile with a base plate and six short terminal fibers. The genome has been fully sequenced and consists of 36,717 nucleotides, coding for 55 proteins.

== History ==
Mu phage was first discovered by Larry Taylor at UC Berkeley in the late 1950s. His work continued at Brookhaven National Laboratory, where he first observed the mutagenic properties of Mu; several colonies of Hfr E. coli which had been lysogenized with Mu seemed to have a tendency to develop new nutritional markers. With further investigation, he was able to link the presence of these markers to the physical binding of Mu at a certain loci. He likened the observed genetic alteration to the ‘controlling elements’ in maize, and named the phage ‘Mu’, for mutation.

=== Key Mu-related findings ===
1972–1975: Ahmad Bukhari shows that Mu can insert randomly and prolifically throughout an entire bacterial genome, creating stable insertions. He also demonstrates that the reversion of the gene to its original and undamaged form is possible with the excision Mu.

1979: Jim Shapiro develops a Mu inspired model for transposition involving the ‘Shapiro Intermediate,’ in which both the donor and the target undergo two cleavages and then the donor is ligated into the target, creating two replication forks and allowing for both transposition and replication.

1983: Kiyoshi Mizuuchi develops a protocol for observing transposition in vitro using mini-Mu plasmids, allowing for a greatly increased understanding of the chemical components of transposition.

1994–2012: Because of shared mechanisms of insertion, Mu acts as a useful organism to elucidate the process of HIV integration, eventually leading to HIV integrase inhibitors such as raltegravir in 2008. Additionally, Montano et al. created a crystal structure of the Mu bacteriophage transpososome, allowing for a detailed understanding of the process Mu amplification.
