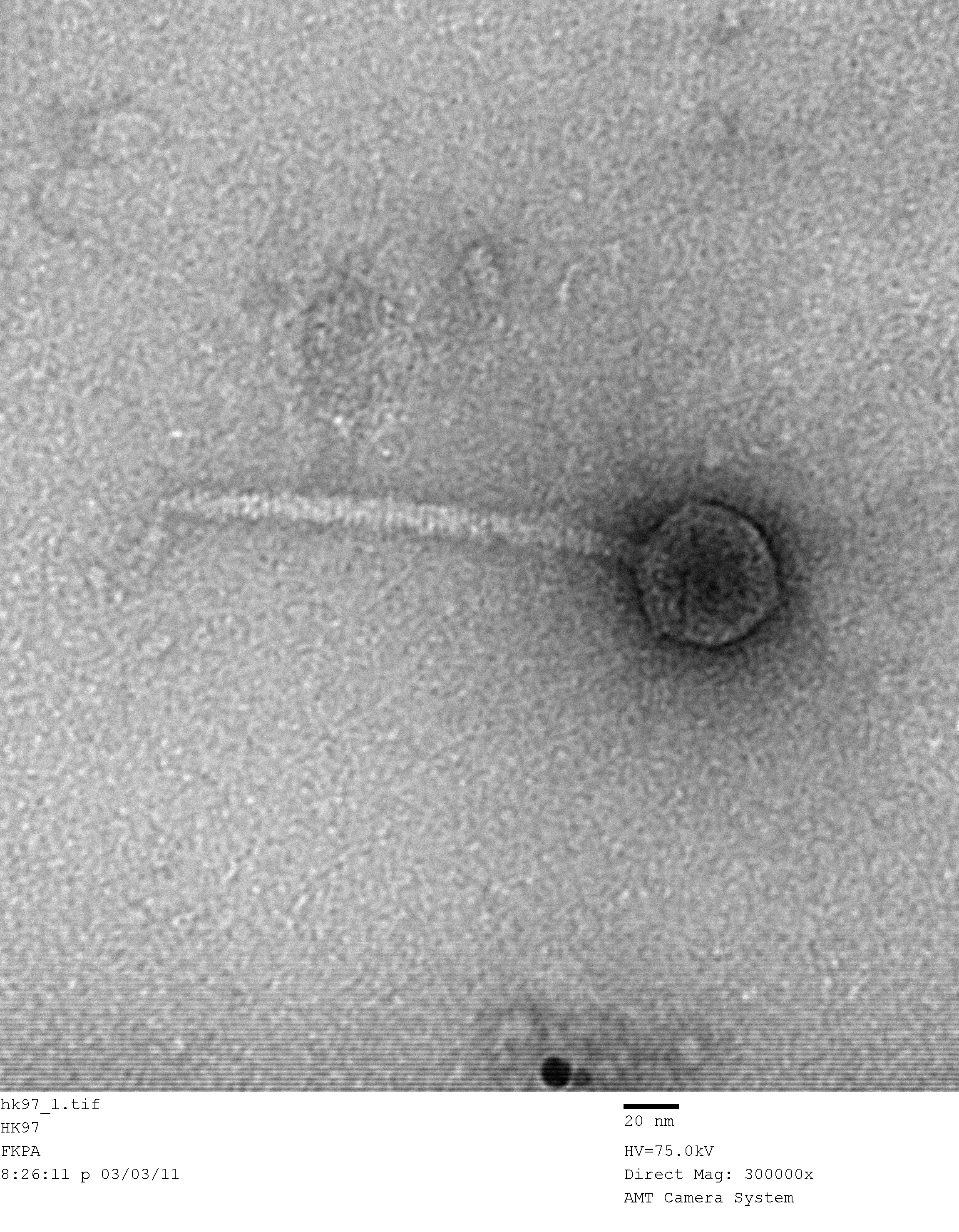
- Bacteriophage HK97 as seen in transmission electron microscopy (TEM), with magnification 300000x.

Virus classification
- (unranked): Virus
- Realm: Duplodnaviria
- Kingdom: Heunggongvirae
- Phylum: Uroviricota
- Class: Caudoviricetes
- Genus: Byrnievirus
- Species: Byrnievirus HK97

Synonyms
- Bacteriophage HK97; Phage HK97; HK97 bacteriophage; HK97 phage; Escherichia phage HK97; Escherichia virus HK97

= Bacteriophage HK97 =

Species of virus

Bacteriophage HK97, often shortened to HK97, is a species of virus that infects Escherichia coli and related bacteria. It is named after Hong Kong (HK), where it was first located. HK97 has a double-stranded DNA genome.

== Assembly and maturation ==
The major capsid protein of HK97, called gp5, cross-links upon maturation to form a chain-mail like structure.

The HK97 assembly pathway begins with self-assembly of gp5 into pentamers and hexamers. A protease, called gp4, cleaves gp5 at its N-terminus. Attachment of a portal protein, gp3, coupled with conformational changes leads to the formation of a prohead, or procapsid, which is the precursor to the mature capsid. A scaffolding protein is not required for capsid assembly. However, studies on the effects of deleting the delta domain of the major capsid protein, or parts of it, indicate that it is essential for assembly.
