= Bcepmuvirus =

Virus classification
- (unranked): Virus
- Realm: Duplodnaviria
- Kingdom: Heunggongvirae
- Phylum: Uroviricota
- Class: Caudoviricetes
- Genus: Bcepmuvirus

Genus of viruses

Bcepmuvirus is a genus of viruses in the class Caudoviricetes, not assigned to a subfamily. Bacteria serve as the natural host, with transmission achieved through passive diffusion. There are two species in this genus.

== Taxonomy ==
The following two species are assigned to the genus:

- Burkholderia virus BcepMu
- Burkholderia virus phiE255

== Structure ==
Bcepmuviruses are nonenveloped, with a head and tail. The head has an elongated icosahedral symmetry (T=13, Q=21).

== Genome ==
Both species have been fully sequenced and are available from ICTV. They range between 36k and 38k nucleotides, with 53 to 55 proteins. The complete genomes are available from here.

== Life cycle ==
The virus attaches to the host cell using its terminal fibers, and ejects the viral DNA into the host cytoplasm via contraction of its tail sheath. Once the viral genes have been replicated, the procapsid is assembled and packed. The tail is then assembled and the mature virions are released via lysis.

== History ==
According to the ICTV's 2010–11 report, the genus Bcepmuvirus was first accepted as a new genus, at the same time as both of its contained species. This proposal is available here.
