= WO virus =

Bacteriophage which affects Wolbachia

WO virus is bacteriophage virus that infects bacteria of the genus Wolbachia, which it is named after. This virus is notable for carrying DNA related to the black widow spider toxin gene, becoming an example of a bacteriophage with animal-like DNA, implying DNA transfers between eukaryotes and bacteriophages.
