= Prohead =

A prohead or procapsid is an immature viral capsid structure formed in the early stages of self-assembly of some bacteriophages, including the Caudovirales or tailed bacteriophages. Production and assembly of stable proheads is an essential precursor to bacteriophage genome packaging; this packaging activity can be replicated in vitro. The prohead structure may take a different shape from the head of a mature virion, as seen with the prohead of Bacillus subtilis phage φ29.
