= Caudoviricetes =

- Structures of T Bacteriophages representing the seven T types of Escherichia coli phages described by Max Delbruck in the 1940s. T4 of the Myoviridae family, T5 of the Siphoviridae family, and T7 of the Podoviridae family. The structures were built from individual protein data bank (pdb) files in the UCSF Chimera software, which were updated to the year 2024 and at real scale.

Virus classification
- (unranked): Virus
- Realm: Duplodnaviria
- Kingdom: Heunggongvirae
- Phylum: Uroviricota
- Class: Caudoviricetes

Subdivisions
- See text

Class of viruses

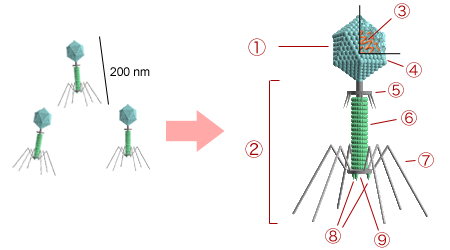
Tailed bacteriophage structure: (1) head, (2) tail, (3) DNA, (4) capsid, (5) collar, (6) sheath, (7) tail fibres, (8) spikes, (9) base plate

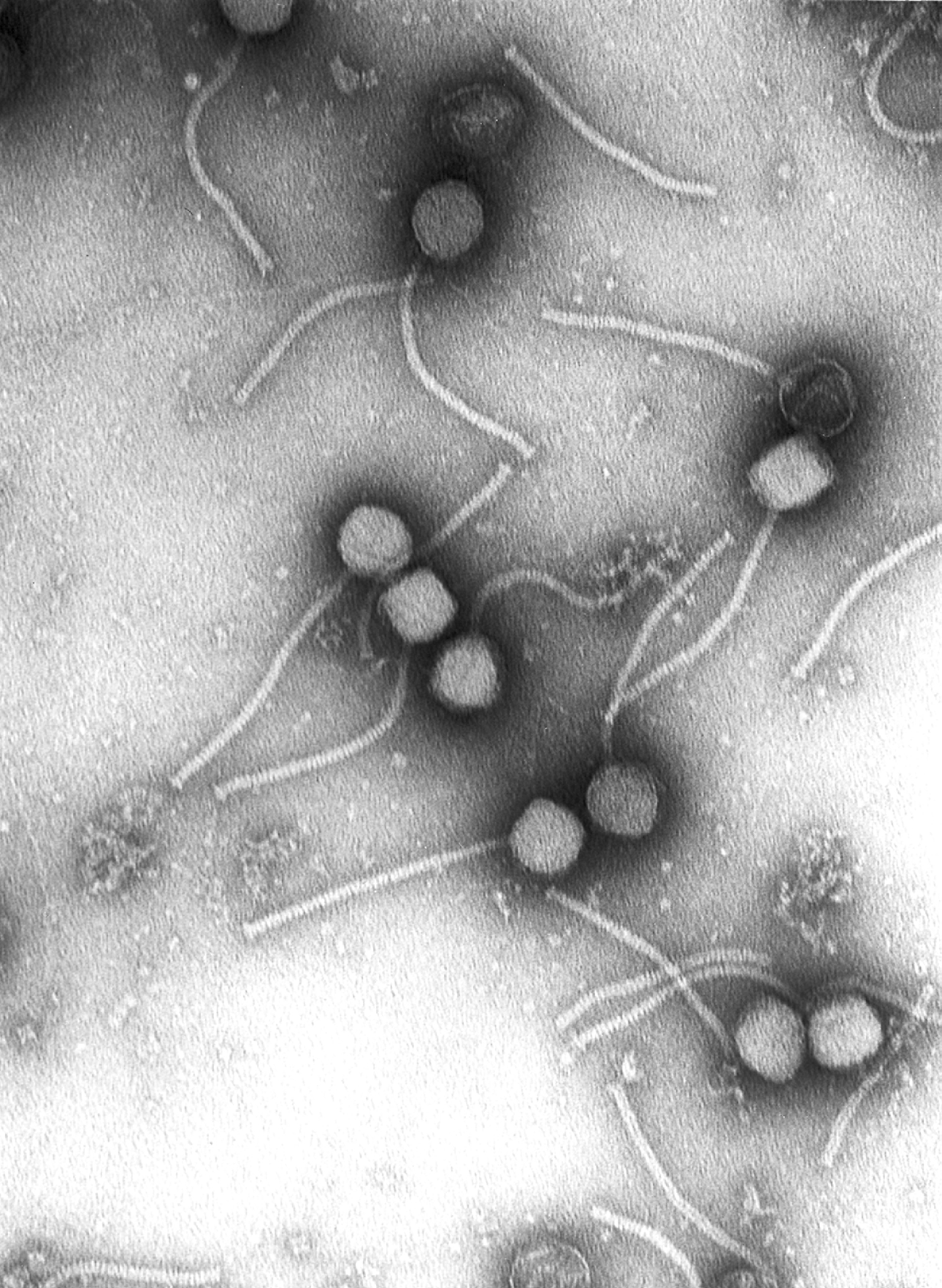
Transmission electron micrograph of Gamma-Phage

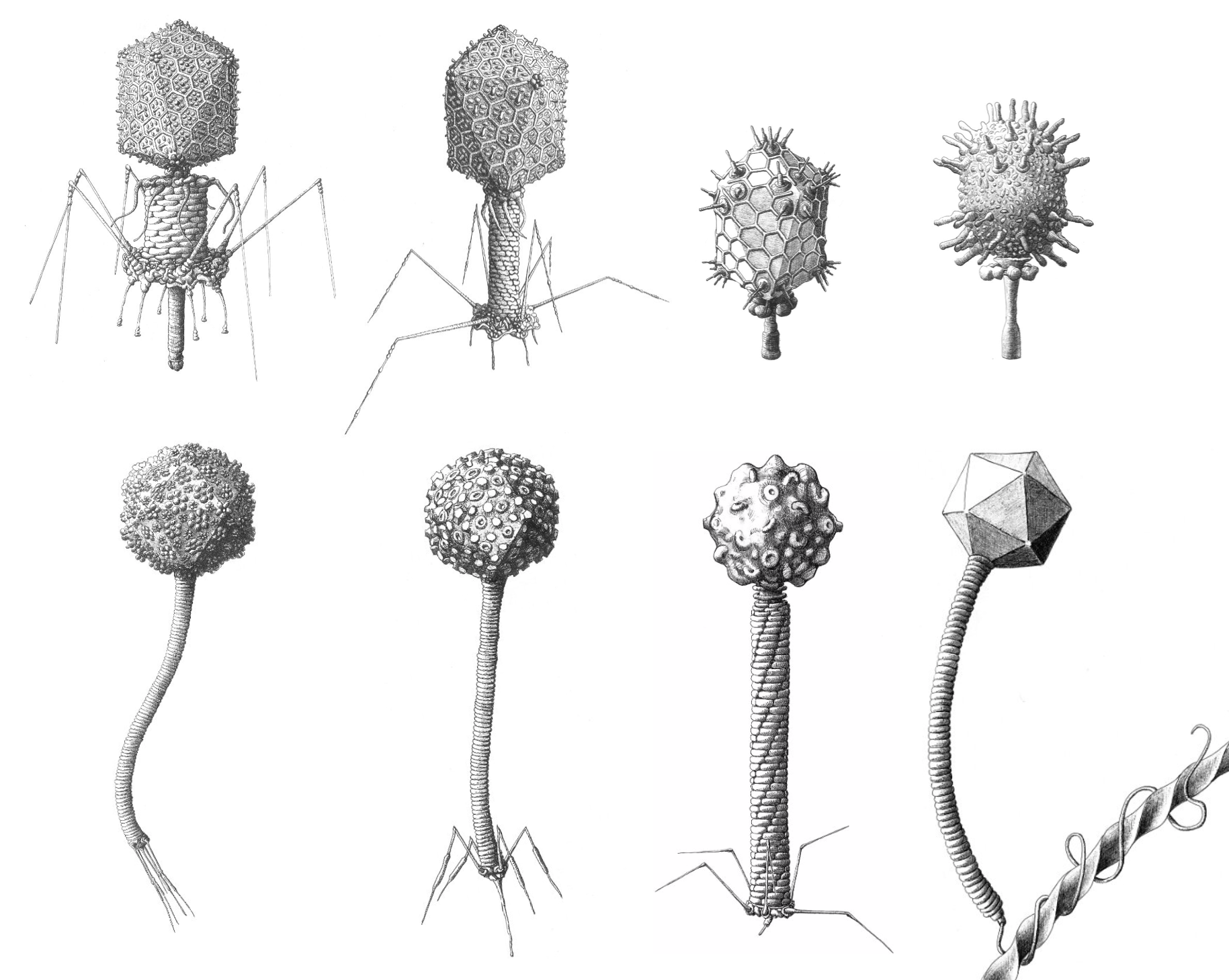
Illustrations of various caudoviricetes. Not to scale.

Caudoviricetes is a class of viruses known as tailed viruses and head-tail viruses (cauda is Latin for "tail"). It is the sole representative of its own phylum, Uroviricota (from ouros (ουρος), a Greek word for "tailed" + -viricota). Under the Baltimore classification scheme, the Caudoviricetes are group I viruses as they have double stranded DNA (dsDNA) genomes, which can be anywhere from 18,000 base pairs to 500,000 base pairs in length. The virus particles have a distinct shape; each virion has an icosahedral head that contains the viral genome, and is attached to a flexible tail by a connector protein. The order encompasses a wide range of viruses, many containing genes of similar nucleotide sequence and function. However, some tailed bacteriophage genomes can vary quite significantly in nucleotide sequence, even among the same genus. Due to their characteristic structure and possession of potentially homologous genes, it is believed these viruses possess a common origin.

== Infection ==
Upon encountering a host cell, the tail section of the virion binds to receptors on the cell surface and delivers the DNA into the cell by use of an injectisome-like mechanism (an injectisome is a nanomachine that evolved for the delivery of proteins by type III secretion). The tail section of the virus punches a hole through the cell wall and plasma membrane and the genome passes down the tail into the cell. Once inside the genes are expressed from transcripts made by the host machinery, using host ribosomes. Typically, the genome is replicated by use of concatemers, in which overlapping segments of DNA are made, and then put together to form the whole genome.

== Assembly and maturation ==
Viral capsid proteins come together to form a precursor prohead, into which the genome enters. Once this has occurred, the prohead undergoes maturation by cleavage of capsid subunits to form an icosahedral phage head with 5-fold symmetry. After the head maturation, the tail is joined in one of two ways: Either the tail is constructed separately, and joined with the connector, or the tail is constructed directly onto the phage head. The tails consist of helix based proteins with 6-fold symmetry. After maturation of virus particles, the cell is lysed by lysins, holins, or a combination of the two.

== Taxonomy ==
=== History ===
For most of virological history, Caudoviricetes which was known as the order Caudovirales, had lower taxa defined via morphology and contractile ability of their "tails". The Myoviridae had long tails that were contractile; the Podoviridae had short noncontractile tails; and the Siphoviridae had long noncontractile tails. Siphoviridae constitute the majority of the known tailed viruses.

Bradley referred to what was known as the Myoviridae as type A, Siphoviridae as type B, and the Podoviridae as type C. He also divided his groups on the basis of head morphology: Within group A, A1 have small isometric heads; A2 have prolate heads; and A3 have elongated heads. Within groups B and C, numbers were similarly assigned: B1 and C1 have small isometric heads; B2 and C2 have prolate heads; and B3 and C3 have elongated heads.

In 2021 the "families" Myoviridae, Podoviridae and Siphoviridae were abolished for being polyphyletic. The same happened to Caudovirales, which has accumulated into somewhat of a wastebasket taxon. As a result, there are now many free-floating families, subfamilies, and genera in the class without any preceding taxa before Caudoviricetes. The ICTV report associated with the specific change is: 2021.001B Abolish the order Caudovirales and the families Myoviridae, Siphoviridae and Podoviridae (Caudoviricetes).

As of ICTV 2025 release the class contains 13 orders and a large number of unassigned taxa, listed hereafter.

=== Orders ===
- Adrikavirales
- Autographivirales
- Crassvirales
- Grandevirales
- Juravirales
- Kirjokansivirales
- Magrovirales
- Metacrassvirales
- Methanobavirales
- Nakonvirales
- Pantevenvirales
- Paracrassvirales
- Thumleimavirales

=== Unassigned taxa ===
==== Unassigned families ====
The following families are unassigned to an order:

- Aggregaviridae
- Aliceevansviridae
- Alisviridae
- Altumviridae
- Anamaviridae
- Andersonviridae
- Arenbergviridae
- Assalcaviridae
- Assiduviridae
- Berryhillviridae
- Blefusviridae
- Buchnerviridae
- Casidaviridae
- Casjensviridae
- Chaseviridae
- Chimalliviridae
- Clermontviridae
- Colingsworthviridae
- Connertonviridae
- Dallocaviridae
- Danacaviridae
- Demerecviridae
- Drexlerviridae
- Duneviridae
- Ehrlichviridae
- Felixviridae
- Fervensviridae
- Forsetiviridae
- Fredfastierviridae
- Fuxiviridae
- Grimontviridae
- Guelinviridae
- Gulliviridae
- Helgolandviridae
- Herelleviridae
- Hirszfeldviridae
- Hodgkinviridae
- Infernusviridae
- Jasonviridae
- Jeanschmidtviridae
- Kleczkowskaviridae
- Konodaiviridae
- Kruegerviridae
- Kunpengviridae
- Lilliviridae
- Lindbergviridae
- Ludisviridae
- Luriaviridae
- Lutetiaviridae
- Lutzviridae
- Madisaviridae
- Madridviridae
- Mariniviridae
- Mazoviaviridae
- Mesyanzhinovviridae
- Molycolviridae
- Mtkvariviridae
- Naomviridae
- Nixviridae
- Orlajensenviridae
- Pachyviridae
- Peduoviridae
- Pervagoviridae
- Pituviridae
- Pootjesviridae
- Pungoviridae
- Quasboviridae
- Rountreeviridae
- Saffermanviridae
- Saladoviridae
- Salasmaviridae
- Saparoviridae
- Sarkviridae
- Schitoviridae
- Seadebiviridae
- Speroviridae
- Stackebrandtviridae
- Stanwillamsviridae
- Suolaviridae
- Tenebraviridae
- Toyamaviridae
- Trautnerviridae
- Umezonoviridae
- Vandenendeviridae
- Verdandiviridae
- Vertoviridae
- Vilmaviridae
- Winoviridae
- Zierdtviridae
- Zimmerviridae
- Zobellviridae

==== Unassigned subfamilies ====
The following subfamilies are unassigned to a family and order:

- Alphabravovirinae
- Alvaradovirinae
- Andregratiaviridae
- Andrewesvirinae
- Arquatrovirinae
- Azeredovirinae
- Bclasvirinae
- Beaumontvirinae
- Beephvirinae
- Bronfenbrennervirinae
- Cardingvirinae
- Ceeclamvirinae
- Ceeteevirinae
- Chebruvirinae
- Daemsvirinae
- Dclasvirinae
- Deejayvirinae
- Deeyouvirinae
- Dovevirinae
- Dravavirinae
- Durvirinae
- Eekayvirinae
- Feeclasvirinae
- Ferrettivirinae
- Frobishervirinae
- Gclasvirinae
- Gochnauervirinae
- Gracegardnervirinae
- Guarnerosvirinae
- Gutmannvirinae
- Heleneionescovirinae
- Hendrixvirinae
- Iiscvirinae
- Jameshumphriesvirinae
- Jianjiangvirinae
- Joanripponvirinae
- Johnpaulvirinae
- Jondennisvirinae
- Langleyhallvirinae
- Mccleskeyvirinae
- Mcshanvirinae
- Munstervirinae
- Nclasvirinae
- Nymbaxtervirinae
- Pclasvirinae
- Pearlrivervirinae
- Queuovirinae
- Ruthgordonvirinae
- Santaclaravirinae
- Sejongvirinae
- Sepvirinae
- Skryabinvirinae
- Stanbaylleyvirinae
- Stephanstirmvirinae
- Trabyvirinae
- Tybeckvirinae
- Vequintavirinae
- Wallmarkvirinae
- Weiservirinae

==== Unassigned genera ====
The following genera are unassigned to a family, subfamily, and order:

- Abaiavirus
- Abbeymikolonvirus
- Abouovirus
- Adaiavirus
- Agmunavirus
- Aguilavirus
- Ahotrevirus
- Akiravirus
- Alachuavirus
- Alcyoneusvirus
- Alexandravirus
- Amherstvirus
- Amigovirus
- Amiranvirus
- Anamdongvirus
- Anatolevirus
- Andrewvirus
- Anjalivirus
- Anthonyvirus
- Aokuangvirus
- Appavirus
- Aquingentivirus
- Aramisvirus
- Arawnvirus
- Archimedesvirus
- Armstrongvirus
- Arvduovirus
- Ashduovirus
- Aspduovirus
- Asteriusvirus
- Astrithrvirus
- Athenavirus
- Atraxavirus
- Attisvirus
- Attoomivirus
- Audreyjarvisvirus
- Aurunvirus
- Aussievirus
- Austintatiousvirus
- Axeltriavirus
- Backyardiganvirus
- Badaztecvirus
- Baikalvirus
- Bantamvirus
- Barbavirus
- Barnyardvirus
- Bauervirus
- Baybaevirus
- Bcepmuvirus
- Beceayunavirus
- Becedseptimavirus
- Beenievirus
- Behunavirus
- Bendigovirus
- Benedictvirus
- Bernalvirus
- Betterkatzvirus
- Bglawtbvirus
- Bigmanorsvirus
- Bingvirus
- Bippervirus
- Bismarckvirus
- Bjornvirus
- Bluefeathervirus
- Bocovirus
- Bonzeevirus
- Borockvirus
- Bowservirus
- Bridgettevirus
- Brigitvirus
- Britbratvirus
- Brunovirus
- Bruynoghevirus
- Buchananvirus
- Bugaksanvirus
- Bunatrivirus
- Burrovirus
- Busanvirus
- Caminolopintovirus
- Camtrevirus
- Cantarevirus
- Capnelvirus
- Carnodivirus
- Carvajevirus
- Casadabanvirus
- Cbastvirus
- Cecivirus
- Cedarrivervirus
- Ceduovirus
- Cequinquevirus
- Chakrabartyvirus
- Chenonavirus
- Chertseyvirus
- Chewyvirus
- Chidieberevirus
- Chopinvirus
- Chymeravirus
- Cimandefvirus
- Cimpunavirus
- Cinunavirus
- Clawzvirus
- Coatlandelriovirus
- Cobrasixvirus
- Coetzeevirus
- Coeurvirus
- Colneyvirus
- Colunavirus
- Comeauvirus
- Coralvirus
- Corndogvirus
- Coventryvirus
- Craquatrovirus
- Cratervirus
- Cronusvirus
- Cukevirus
- Daredevilvirus
- Decurrovirus
- Delepquintavirus
- Delfunavirus
- Delislevirus
- Demosthenesvirus
- Denisevirus
- Deseoctovirus
- Detrevirus
- Deurplevirus
- Dhillonvirus
- Dibbivirus
- Dinavirus
- Dismasvirus
- Docdeeseptimavirus
- Dolmabahcevirus
- Donellivirus
- Doucettevirus
- Dubuvirus
- Dybvigvirus
- Eagleeyevirus
- Edenvirus
- Edwardsroadvirus
- Eetrevirus
- Efemquintavirus
- Efemunavirus
- Efquatrovirus
- Efunavirus
- Eiauvirus
- Eisenstarkvirus
- Elemovirus
- Elerivirus
- Elmenteitavirus
- Emdodecavirus
- Emirosevirus
- Emperorvirus
- Eneladusvirus
- Enfavirus
- Enhodamvirus
- Eponavirus
- Ericdabvirus
- Eurybiavirus
- Evaavirus
- Eyrevirus
- Fairfaxidumvirus
- Fajavirus
- Farahnazvirus
- Fattrevirus
- Fenglinvirus
- Feofaniavirus
- Fernvirus
- Fibralongavirus
- Ficleduovirus
- Finchvirus
- Finkelvirus
- Fipvunavirus
- Firingavirus
- Footloosevirus
- Forzavirus
- Fowlmouthvirus
- Foxquatrovirus
- Foxunavirus
- Franklinbayvirus
- Frederiksbergvirus
- Fremauxvirus
- Fromanvirus
- Fukuivirus
- Fuzanglongvirus
- Gaiavirus
- Galaxyvirus
- Galunavirus
- Gamtrevirus
- Gervaisevirus
- Getseptimavirus
- Ghobesvirus
- Gilesvirus
- Gilgameshvirus
- Gillianvirus
- Gimaduovirus
- Gladiatorvirus
- Godonkavirus
- Gofduovirus
- Goodmanvirus
- Gordonvirus
- Gordtnkvirus
- Gorganvirus
- Gorjumvirus
- Grutrevirus
- Gustavvirus
- Hafyongvirus
- Haihevirus
- Halcyonevirus
- Halfdanvirus
- Hapunavirus
- Harrisonburgvirus
- Hattifnattvirus
- Hedwigvirus
- Heilongjiangvirus
- Helsingorvirus
- Hestiavirus
- Hiroshimavirus
- Hiyaavirus
- Hnatkovirus
- Hollowayvirus
- Holosalinivirus
- Homburgvirus
- Howevirus
- Huairouvirus
- Hubeivirus
- Hulijingvirus
- Hungariovirus
- Iaduovirus
- Ibantikvirus
- Identitycrisisvirus
- Ignaciovirus
- Ikedavirus
- Illiduovirus
- Ilzatvirus
- Immutovirus
- Incheonvirus
- Indlulamithivirus
- Inhavirus
- Iodovirus
- Ionavirus
- Isoldevirus
- Ittyvirus
- Jacevirus
- Jarrellvirus
- Jasminevirus
- Jenstvirus
- Jimmervirus
- Juiceboxvirus
- Jujuvirus
- Junavirus
- Kafunavirus
- Kairosalinivirus
- Kamchatkavirus
- Kampevirus
- Kelleziovirus
- Kelquatrovirus
- Kimonavirus
- Klausavirus
- Kleczkowskavirus
- Klementvirus
- Klepvirus
- Knuthellervirus
- Kochitakasuvirus
- Kojivirus
- Konstantinevirus
- Korravirus
- Kostyavirus
- Krampusvirus
- Krompvirus
- Kronosvirus
- Krylovvirus
- Kryptosalinivirus
- Kuleanavirus
- Kumottavirus
- Kungbxnavirus
- Kunmingvirus
- Lacfervirus
- Lacnuvirus
- Lacusarxvirus
- Lafunavirus
- Lagaffevirus
- Lanavirus
- Larmunavirus
- Laroyevirus
- Lastavirus
- Latrobevirus
- Lederbergvirus
- Leicestervirus
- Lentavirus
- Lessievirus
- Lietduovirus
- Lightbulbvirus
- Lillamyvirus
- Lilspottyvirus
- Lilyvirus
- Lingdingyangvirus
- Lishizhenvirus
- Llyrvirus
- Lokivirus
- Loughboroughvirus
- Lowersilesiavirus
- Lubbockvirus
- Luchadorvirus
- Luckybarnesvirus
- Luckytenvirus
- Lughvirus
- Luojiashanvirus
- Lwoffvirus
- Macdonaldcampvirus
- Magadivirus
- Magiavirus
- Majavirus
- Malagasyrosevirus
- Malkevirus
- Manovirus
- Marchandvirus
- Mardecavirus
- Mareflavirus
- Marfavirus
- Mariborvirus
- Marienburgvirus
- Marvinvirus
- Maxrubnervirus
- Mboduovirus
- Mboquatrovirus
- Mcgonagallvirus
- Medeavirus
- Melbournevirus
- Menderavirus
- Metrivirus
- Micavirus
- Microwolfvirus
- Midgardsormrvirus
- Miecznikowavirus
- Mieseafarmvirus
- Mimasvirus
- Minunavirus
- Minyavirus
- Miyazakivirus
- Mohonavirus
- Mollymurvirus
- Montyvirus
- Motookavirus
- Moturavirus
- Mudcatvirus
- Mufasoctovirus
- Muldoonvirus
- Muminvirus
- Murrayvirus
- Mushuvirus
- Muvirus
- Mweyongvirus
- Mycoabscvirus
- Myoalterovirus
- Myradeevirus
- Myxoctovirus
- Namazuvirus
- Nanchangvirus
- Nanhaivirus
- Neferthenavirus
- Nevevirus
- Nickievirus
- Nitrunavirus
- Nonanavirus
- Northamptonvirus
- Nubrunavirus
- Nyceiraevirus
- Nylescharonvirus
- Odravirus
- Oengusvirus
- Omegavirus
- Oneupvirus
- Onyinyevirus
- Oonoonbavirus
- Oscarsovirus
- Oshimavirus
- Paclarkvirus
- Pagevirus
- Pahexavirus
- Pankowvirus
- Papyrusvirus
- Parlovirus
- Patiencevirus
- Pavtokvirus
- Peebenunavirus
- Peekonunavirus
- Peesulunavirus
- Peethiunavirus
- Peetremavirus
- Peeyeiunavirus
- Pemunavirus
- Pepyhexavirus
- Perisivirus
- Persistencevirus
- Phabquatrovirus
- Pharaohvirus
- Phifelvirus
- Phleivirus
- Phrappuccinovirus
- Picardvirus
- Pikminvirus
- Piorkowskivirus
- Plaisancevirus
- Plateaulakevirus
- Pleeduovirus
- Pleetrevirus
- Polybotosvirus
- Popoffvirus
- Porunavirus
- Poushouvirus
- Powerballvirus
- Predatorvirus
- Psavirus
- Pukovnikvirus
- Pulverervirus
- Pumpernickelvirus
- Punavirus
- Puppervirus
- Purivirus
- Qingdaovirus
- Questintvirus
- Quivirus
- Rahariannevirus
- Raleighvirus
- Rauchvirus
- Ravarandavirus
- Ravinvirus
- Rcapmuvirus
- Readingvirus
- Refugevirus
- Reqipinevirus
- Rerduovirus
- Reynauldvirus
- Ribunavirus
- Richievirus
- Ricunavirus
- Rigallicvirus
- Rimavirus
- Rivsvirus
- Rockefellervirus
- Rockvillevirus
- Rogerhendrixvirus
- Ronaldovirus
- Rosariovirus
- Rosemountvirus
- Roslyckyvirus
- Roufvirus
- Rovertvirus
- Rowavirus
- Ruthyvirus
- Ryyoungvirus
- Sagamiharavirus
- Saintgironsvirus
- Salmondvirus
- Saltrevirus
- Samaravirus
- Samunavirus
- Sandinevirus
- Sansavirus
- Santafevirus
- Santhisvirus
- Saphexavirus
- Sargevirus
- Sarumanvirus
- Sasdunavirus
- Sashavirus
- Sasquatchvirus
- Sasvirus
- Saundersvirus
- Sawaravirus
- Scappvirus
- Scapunavirus
- Schmidvirus
- Schmittlotzvirus
- Schnabeltiervirus
- Schubertvirus
- Seahorsevirus
- Seamegvirus
- Segzyvirus
- Sendosyvirus
- Seongbukvirus
- Sepahanvirus
- Serbinvirus
- Seussvirus
- Sextaecvirus
- Sfunavirus
- Shandongvirus
- Sheenvirus
- Sherbrookevirus
- Shirahamavirus
- Shockervirus
- Shoyavirus
- Shuimuvirus
- Sidiousvirus
- Siftrevirus
- Silentrexvirus
- Sixamavirus
- Skarprettervirus
- Skatevirus
- Skogvirus
- Skulduggeryvirus
- Skunavirus
- Slashvirus
- Sleepyheadvirus
- Smoothievirus
- Snuvirus
- Solivirus
- Sonalivirus
- Sortsnevirus
- Soupsvirus
- Sozzivirus
- Sparkyvirus
- Spartoivirus
- Spbetavirus
- Spizizenvirus
- Squashvirus
- Stanholtvirus
- Stonewallvirus
- Stormageddonvirus
- Strymvirus
- Successvirus
- Sukhumvitvirus
- Svunavirus
- Swiduovirus
- Syrbvirus
- Tabiovirus
- Takahashivirus
- Tandoganvirus
- Tankvirus
- Tantvirus
- Taranisvirus
- Terapinvirus
- Teubervirus
- Theosmithvirus
- Thiercelinvirus
- Thornevirus
- Tieomvirus
- Tijeunavirus
- Timshelvirus
- Tinduovirus
- Titanvirus
- Toutatisvirus
- Triavirus
- Trigintaduovirus
- Trinavirus
- Trinevirus
- Triplejayvirus
- Trogglehumpervirus
- Turbidovirus
- Typhavirus
- Uetakevirus
- Uwajimavirus
- Valentinivirus
- Vedamuthuvirus
- Veewebvirus
- Veracruzvirus
- Vespunovirus
- Vhulanivirus
- Vicosavirus
- Vidquintavirus
- Waukeshavirus
- Wbetavirus
- Weaselvirus
- Whackvirus
- Whiteheadvirus
- Whytuvirus
- Wodongavirus
- Woesvirus
- Wollypogvirus
- Wolominvirus
- Woodruffvirus
- Xajduovirus
- Xiamenvirus
- Xipdecavirus
- Xuquatrovirus
- Yanchengvirus
- Yeceytrevirus
- Yokohamavirus
- Yoloswagvirus
- Yongloolinvirus
- Yvonnevirus
- Zhangqianvirus
- Zhuquevirus
- Zizhuyuanvirus
- Zukovirus

== See also ==
- WO virus
