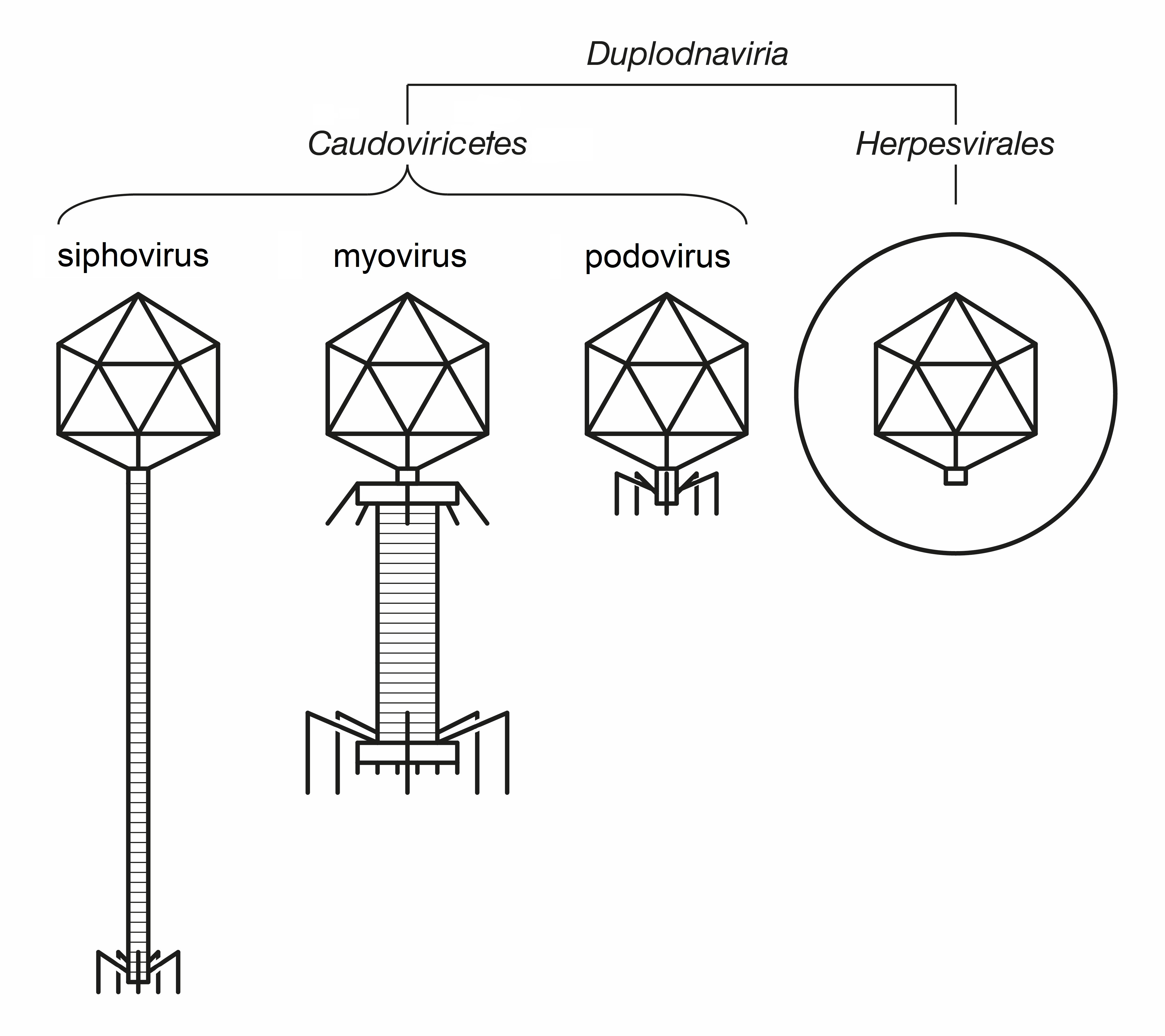
- Illustrated comparison of Duplodnaviria virions

Virus classification
- (unranked): Virus
- Realm: Duplodnaviria
- Kingdom: Heunggongvirae

Subtaxa
- See text

Synonyms
- HK97-like group; HK97 major capsid protein supermodule

= Duplodnaviria =

Realm of viruses

Duplodnaviria is a realm of viruses that includes all double-stranded DNA viruses that encode the HK97 fold major capsid protein. The HK97 fold major capsid protein (HK97 MCP) is the primary component of the viral capsid, which stores the viral deoxyribonucleic acid (DNA). Viruses in the realm also share a number of other characteristics, such as an icosahedral capsid, an opening in the capsid called a portal, a protease enzyme that empties the inside of the capsid prior to DNA packaging, and a terminase enzyme that packages viral DNA into the capsid. There are three groups of viruses in the realm: caudoviruses, herpesviruses, and the putative group mirusviruses.

Caudoviruses are one of the most abundant group of viruses on Earth and are ubiquitous worldwide. They infect prokaryotes and are a major cause of death in them, which contributes to the recycling of organic material in a process called viral shunt. Caudoviruses have been used as model organisms to study biological processes and as a form of therapy to treat bacterial infections. Herpesviruses infect animals and are commonly associated with diseases such as herpes and chickenpox. Mirusviruses infect microscopic eukaryotes and are among the most common eukaryotic viruses in sunlit oceans. Many duplodnavirians are able to enter a latent state in which they persist in cells without forming virions, called the lysogenic cycle.

Duplodnaviria likely predates the last universal common ancestor (LUCA) of cellular life and was present in the LUCA. Caudoviruses in particular were likely already diverse by the time the LUCA emerged. Mirusviruses are related to viruses in the phylum Nucleocytoviricota in the realm Varidnaviria because they encode the core replication- and transcription-related proteins found in nucleocytoviruses. It is unclear, however, which realm these genes originate from. In any case, herpesviruses appear to have lost most of these genes through reductive evolution. Outside the realm, an HK97-like fold is only found in encapsulins, which form nanocompartments in prokaryotes and are likely derived from duplodnaviruses.

== Classification ==
Duplodnaviria contains one kingdom, which is divided into two phyla that contain two lineages of viruses in the realm: caudoviruses and herpesviruses. This can be visualized as follows:

- Realm: Duplodnaviria
  - Kingdom: Heunggongvirae
    - Phylum: Peploviricota
      - Class: Herviviricetes
        - Order: Herpesvirales – herpesviruses, which infect animals (eukaryotes)
    - Phylum: Uroviricota
      - Class: Caudoviricetes – caudoviruses, also called head-tail viruses and tailed viruses, which infect archaea and bacteria (prokaryotes)

The realm also contains mirusviruses, which have not been assigned to any taxon officially but which constitute the putative phylum Mirusviricota. As all viruses in the realm are double-stranded DNA (dsDNA) viruses, the realm belongs to Group I: dsDNA viruses of Baltimore classification, a classification system based on a virus's manner of messenger RNA (mRNA) production that is often used alongside standard virus taxonomy, which is based on evolutionary history. Realms are the highest level of taxonomy used for viruses and Duplodnaviria is one of ten. The others are Adnaviria, Efunaviria, Floreoviria, Pleomoviria, Riboviria, Ribozyviria, Singelaviria, Varidnaviria, and Volvereviria.

== Core characteristics ==
All viruses in Duplodnaviria contain an icosahedral capsid that is composed of a major capsid protein (MCP) that contains a unique folded structure, called the HK97 fold, named after the folded structure of the MCP of the bacterial virus HK97. The conserved elements of the HK97 fold, found in all duplodnavirians, are the axial (A) domain, the peripheral (P) domain, the extended (E) loop, and the N-terminal (N) arm. Many MCPs contain additional elements, such as the insertion (I) domain, which is grafted onto the A-domain, and the glycine-rich (G) loop, found in bacteriophage HK97's MCP. Other hallmark traits among viruses in the realm involve the structure and assembly of capsids and include a portal protein that forms the opening of the capsid, a protease that empties the capsid before viral DNA is packaged, and a terminase enzyme that packages viral DNA into the capsid. In herpesviruses, their proteases are often referred to as assemblins.

After HK97 MCPs have been synthesized by the host cell's ribosomes, the viral capsid is assembled from them with the proteins bonding to each other. The first product of capsid assembly is a procapsid, also called prohead for caudoviruses. Procapsids are roughly spherical, lumpy, and thick. Assembly of procapsids is driven by scaffold proteins that guide the geometric construction of the procapsid. In the absence of such proteins, the delta domain of the MCP, which faces toward the inside of the capsid, acts as a scaffold protein. A cylindrical opening the capsid, the portal, that serves as the entrance and exit for viral DNA is created with portal proteins at one of the 12 vertices of the capsid. After capsid assembly, scaffold proteins are removed from the inside of the capsid by the capsid maturation protease, which may be part of the scaffolding. Scaffold proteins may be removed intact or after the protease breaks them down in a process called proteolysis, either of which leaves the inside of the procapsid empty.

At the same time as capsid assembly, replication of viral DNA occurs, and long molecules of DNA containing numerous copies of the viral genome, called concatemers, are created. The enzyme terminase, made of two subunits (large and small), finds the viral DNA inside of the cell via the small subunit, cuts the concatemers, and creates the endings (termini) of the genomes. Terminase recognizes a packaging signal in the genome and cuts the nucleic acid, creating a free end that it binds to. The terminase, now bound to the concatemer, attaches itself to the capsid portal and begins translocating the DNA from outside the capsid to the inside, using energy generated from ATP hydrolysis by its large subunit. As more DNA is inserted into the capsid, the capsid expands in size, becomes thinner, and its surface becomes flatter and more angular. Once the genome is completely inside, terminase cuts the concatemer again, completing packaging. Terminase then detaches itself from the portal and proceeds to repeat this process until all genomes in the concatemer have been packaged into capsids.

For caudoviruses, the capsid is called the "head" of the complete virus particle and the rest of the virion is called the "tail". Caudoviruses sometimes have decoration proteins that attach to the capsid's surface to reinforance its structure. The tail, which is used for attaching to cells and injecting viral DNA into them, is assembled separately from the capsid and attached at the portal after DNA packaging. Caudoviruses have three types of tails and are informally referred to by which type of tail they have: short, non-contractile tails (podoviruses), long, contractile tails (myoviruses), and long, non-contractile, flexible tails (siphoviruses). After the virion is fully assembled, it leaves the cell. Caudoviruses leave the cell via rupturing of the cell membrane (lysis), which causes cell death. Herpesviruses leave via exocytosis after obtaining an envelope that covers the capsid from cellular vesicles from the Golgi apparatus.

== Distribution ==
Caudoviruses are one of the most abundant groups of viruses on Earth and are the most numerous viruses in prokaryotes. They can be found in a wide variety of environments, including geothermal, hypersaline, soil, marine, and moderate ecosystems, as well as in the human body. In certain environments, however, they may be outnumbered by other viruses, such as tectiliviricetes in marine environments and ssDNA viruses in offshore sediments. Archaeal caudoviruses transfer biomes recurrently via host-switching, including transferring between anoxic, hypersaline, and marine environments. Archaeal caudoviruses adapted to hypersaline environments become inactivated when removed from the environment but reactivate when reintroduced, indicating that they depend on high salinity.

Mirusviruses have been identified in most major lineages of eukaryotes, both unicellular and multicellular, including eukaryotes in saltwater, freshwater, soil, as well as in parasites of animals and plants. They commonly infect marine eukaryotic plankton and are among the most abundant eukaryotic viruses in sunlit oceans. They are especially common in the euphotic subsurface layer where chlorophyll concentrations are high. Different mirusviruses are found in different regions; for example, some are found exclusively in the Arctic Ocean. At Lake Biwa in Japan, a freshwater lake, they are among the most abundant viruses in the epilimnion zone of the lake during seasonal algal blooms and are also present in the hypolimnion zone. Most can be described as specific to either the epilimnion, where their presence tended to be transient, or the hypolimnion, where their presence was more persistent.

== Phylogenetics ==
The main scaffold of the HK97 fold MCP appears to have been created from a DUF1884 protein family domain that was inserted into a strand-helix-strand-strand (SHS2) fold protein related to the dodecin protein family. The emergence of duplodnavirians likely came before the last universal common ancestor (LUCA) of cellular life existed, and viruses in the realm likely infected the LUCA. Caudoviruses in particular likely had already diversified and obtained their three morphological types by the time the LUCA emerged. Outside of Duplodnaviria, an HK97-like fold is only found in encapsulins, proteins that form a type of prokaryotic nanocompartment that encapsulates a variety of cargo proteins related to the oxidative stress response. Encapsulins assemble into icosahedrons like the capsids of duplodnaviruses, but the HK97 MCP in viruses is much more divergent and widespread than encapsulins, which form a narrow monophyletic clade. As such, it is more likely that encapsulins are derived from viruses than vice versa. Archaea of the phylum Thermoproteota (formerly Crenarchaeota), however, contain encapsulins but are not known to be infected by caudoviruses, so the relation between encapsulins and Duplodnaviria remains unresolved.

The ATPase subunit of Duplodnaviria terminase enzymes that generates energy for packaging viral DNA has the same general structural design of the P-loop fold as the packaging ATPases of viruses in the realm Varidnaviria but are otherwise not directly related to each other. While viruses in Duplodnaviria make use of the HK97 fold for their major capsid proteins, the major capsid proteins of viruses in Varidnaviria instead are marked by double vertical jelly roll folds. The duplodnavirian ATPase likely represents an ancient acquisition shortly after the ancestors of duplodnavirians obtained capsids. The ATPase is distantly related to superfamily 2 helicases and contains an additional RNAse H-fold nuclease domain. Exaptation of this protein involved significant change to the protein, including fusion of the ATPase and nuclease domains.

Mirusviruses contain the hallmark structural genes of Duplodnaviria but also encode the replication and transcription (i.e. "informational") proteins of the Varidnaviria phylum Nucleocytoviricota, indicative of some form of evolutionary relationship between the two groups of viruses. Three possible scenarios have been proposed: a nucleocytovirus had its structural genes replaced with those of Duplodnaviria, the ancestors of mirusviruses inherited their informational proteins the ancestors of nucleocytoviruses, or vice versa. In the third scenario, the ancestors of caudoviruses may have had the informational genes, but they may have been replaced with another group of genes in the caudovirus lineage. The transfer of such genes to varidnavirians may explain the evolutionary leap from "simple" varidnavirians to highly complex nucleocytoviruses. In any case, herpesviruses are thought to have lost most of the informational genes through reductive evolution.

Mirusviruses have been found to integrate their genomes in their hosts and form episomes. Their episomal and integrate forms resemble the episomal and endogenous latent forms of herpesviruses. Furthermore, mirusviruses and herpesviruses have a tower domain inserted in the A subdomain of the HK97 fold that projects away from the surface of assembled capsids. The tower domain of mirusviruses is smaller than the tower domain of herpesviruses. Additionally, animals emerged after unicellular eukaryotes. For these reasons, mirusviruses may more closely resemble the ancestral state of eukaryotic duplodnavirians than herpesviruses, which would have underone reductive evolution and specialized to infecting animal cells. Although mirusviruses likely emerged before herpesviruses, their exact point of origin is unknown.

== Interactions with hosts ==
=== Latency ===
Viruses in Duplodnaviria have two different types of replication cycles: the lytic cycle, whereby infection leads directly to virion formation and exit from the host cell, and the lysogenic cycle, whereby a latent infection retains the viral DNA inside of the host cell without virion formation, either as an episome or via integration into the host cell's DNA, with the possibility of converting to the lytic cycle in the future. Viruses that can replicate through the lysogenic cycle are called temperate or lysogenic viruses. Caudoviruses vary in their temperateness, whereas all herpesviruses are temperate and able to avoid detection by the host's immune system, causing lifelong infections. Mirusviruses also appear to be capable of a lysogenic life cycle as they, like herpesviruses, are able to integrate their genome into the host cell's genome and form extra-chromosomal episomes.

=== Disease ===
Herpesviruses are associated with a wide range of diseases in their hosts, including a respiratory tract illness in chickens, a respiratory and reproductive illness in cattle, and tumors in sea turtles. In humans, herpesviruses usually cause epithelial diseases such as herpes simplex, chickenpox, shingles, and Kaposi's sarcoma. Initial infection causes acute symptoms and leads to lifelong infection via latency. Herpesviruses may emerge from their latency to cause illnesses, which may have severe symptoms such as encephalitis and pneumonia.

=== Viral shunt ===
Caudoviruses are ubiquitous worldwide and are a major cause of death among prokaryotes. Infection may lead to cell death via lysis, the rupturing of the cell membrane. As a result of lysis, organic material from the killed prokaryotes is released into the environment, contributing to a process called viral shunt. Caudoviruses shunt nutrients from organic material away from higher trophic levels so that they can be consumed by organisms in lower trophic levels, which has the effects of recycling nutrients and promoting increased diversity among marine life.

== History ==
Caudoviruses were discovered independently by Frederick Twort in 1915 and Félix d'Hérelle in 1917, and they have been the focus of much research since then. Some have been used as model organisms to study various biological processes. For example, bacteriophage lambda has been used to study gene regulation and the lytic and lysogenic cycles. d'Hérelle envisioned bacteriophages as a way to treat bacterial infections and he first used caudoviruses to treat bacterial infections in 1919. Phage therapy was subsequently used extensively to treat bacterial infections in animals and humans. In the 1940s, phage therapy fell out of use due to the invention of penicillin and other antibiotics, but the emergence of drug-resistant bacteria and a decline in the number of novel antibiotics being invented has sparked renewed interest in using lytic caudoviruses to treat bacterial infections. In the late 1990s, HK97 became the first bacteriophage to have its capsid structure solved.

Diseases in humans caused by herpesviruses have been recognized for much of recorded history, and person-to-person transmission of the herpes simplex virus, the first herpesvirus discovered, was first recognized in 1893 by Émile Vidal. Over time, caudoviruses and herpesviruses were increasingly found to share many characteristics, and their genetic relation was formalized with the establishment of Duplodnaviria in 2019. Caudoviruses were originally classified into three families based on their morphology: Podoviridae, which have short, non-contractile tails; Myoviridae, which have long, contractile tails; and Siphoviridae, which have long, non-contractile, flexible tails. Since the early 2000s, genetic analysis has revealed a high level of diversity among caudoviruses, and the traditional system of morphology-based classification has been replaced with genetics-based classification starting in the late 2010s.

The first possible identification of a mirusvirus was made in thraustochytrids in 1972, but they couldn't be studied further due to the limitations of the methods used at that time. They were officially discovered in 2023 via metagenomic analysis of saltwater biome samples taken from Tara expedition sampling locations throughout the world. A year later, a genetically distinct group of mirusviruses were found in Lake Biwa in Japan, a freshwater lake, and metagenomic testing identified them in most major lineages of eukaryotes. Mirusvirus virions have not been isolated yet, but based on the proteins encoded by them, they are predicted to form capsids resembling those of caudoviruses and herpesviruses.

=== Etymology ===
The name Duplodnaviria is a portmanteau of duplo, the Latin word for double, dna, from deoxyribonucleic acid (DNA), which refers to all members of the realm having double-stranded DNA genomes, and -viria, which is the suffix used for virus realms. Duplodnaviria is monotypic with only one kingdom, Heunggongvirae, so both the realm and kingdom have the same definition. Heunggongvirae takes the first part of its name from Cantonese 香港 [Hēunggóng], meaning and approximately pronounced "Hong Kong", which is a reference to bacteriophage HK97 (Hong Kong 97), the namesake of the HK97 fold, and the suffix -virae, which is the suffix used for virus kingdoms.

== See also ==
- List of higher virus taxa
