= List of virus genera =

Virus classification showing major ranks

This is a list of genera of biological viruses. See also Comparison of computer viruses.

This is an alphabetical list of genera of biological viruses. It includes all genera and subgenera of viruses listed by the International Committee on Taxonomy of Viruses (ICTV) 2022 release.

- For a list of virus families and subfamilies, see List of virus families and subfamilies.
- For a list of virus realms, subrealms, kingdoms, subkingdoms, phyla, subphyla, classes, subclasses, orders, and suborders, see List of higher virus taxa.

== A ==
- Aalivirus
- Aarhusvirus
- Abaiavirus
- Abakapovirus
- Abbeymikolonvirus
- Aberdnavirus
- Abidjanvirus
- Abouovirus
- Acadevirus
- Acadianvirus
- Acajnonavirus
- Acanvirus
- Achlievirus
- Acionnavirus
- Acridvirus
- Actinovirus
- Adahivirus
- Adahmuvirus
- Adaiavirus
- Aegirvirus
- Aerosvirus
- Affertcholeramvirus
- Afonbuvirus
- Agatevirus
- Ageyesisatellite
- Aghbyvirus
- Agmunavirus
- Agnathovirus
- Agricanvirus
- Agtrevirus
- Aguilavirus
- Ahduovirus
- Ahphunavirus
- Ahtivirus
- Ailurivirus
- Akihdevirus
- Akiravirus
- Akonivirus
- Alachuavirus
- Alasvirus
- Albetovirus
- Alcyoneusvirus
- Aldhiuvirus
- Alefpapillomavirus
- Alegriavirus
- Alehndavirus
- Alehxovirus
- Aleptorquevirus
- Alexandravirus
- Aleyavirus
- Aleybvirus
- Alfamovirus
- Alisovirus
- Allexivirus
- Almendravirus
- Alohrdovirus
- Alphaabyssovirus
- Alphaarterivirus
- Alphabaculovirus
- Alphacarmotetravirus
- Alphacarmovirus
- Alphachrysovirus
- Alphacoronavirus
- Alphacrustrhavirus
- Alphadintovirus
- Alphadrosrhavirus
- Alphaendornavirus
- Alphaentomopoxvirus
- Alphafusarivirus
- Alphafusellovirus
- Alphaglobulovirus
- Alphahymrhavirus
- Alphahypovirus
- Alphainfluenzavirus
- Alphaletovirus
- Alphalipothrixvirus
- Alphamesonivirus
- Alphamononivirus
- Alphanecrovirus
- Alphanemrhavirus
- Alphanodavirus
- Alphanucleorhabdovirus
- Alphanudivirus
- Alphaovalivirus
- Alphapapillomavirus
- Alphapaprhavirus
- Alphapartitivirus
- Alphapermutotetravirus
- Alphapironavirus
- Alphapleolipovirus
- Alphapolyomavirus
- Alphaportoglobovirus
- Alpharetrovirus
- Alpharicinrhavirus
- Alphasphaerolipovirus
- Alphaspiravirus
- Alphatectivirus
- Alphatorquevirus
- Alphatrevirus
- Alphatristromavirus
- Alphaturrivirus
- Alphavirus
- Alphayadokarivirus
- Alternavirus
- Amalgavirus
- Amdoparvovirus
- Amginevirus
- Amigovirus
- Aminayvirus
- Amoyvirus
- Ampelovirus
- Ampivirus
- Amplylivirus
- Ampunavirus
- Amubhivirus
- Anamdongvirus
- Anaposvirus
- Anativirus
- Anatolevirus
- Anayavirus
- Anchaingvirus
- Andhasavirus
- Andhaxevirus
- Andhevirus
- Andhravirus
- Andihavirus
- Andrewvirus
- Andromedavirus
- Andurilvirus
- Anedhivirus
- Angainorvirus
- Angelvirus
- Angristvirus
- Anicalvirus
- Anidravirus
- Anjalivirus
- Annadreamyvirus
- Anphevirus
- Antennavirus
- Anthonyvirus
- Antichaacvirus
- Antsirabevirus
- Anulavirus
- Aobingvirus
- Aokuangvirus
- Aoqinvirus
- Aorunvirus
- Aparavirus
- Apdecimavirus
- Apeevirus
- Aphenovirus
- Aphroditevirus
- Aphthovirus
- Apihcavirus
- Appavirus
- Apricotvirus
- Apscaviroid
- Aptresvirus
- Apukhovirus
- Aquabirnavirus
- Aqualaruvirus
- Aqualcavirus
- Aquamavirus
- Aquambidensovirus
- Aquaparamyxovirus
- Aquareovirus
- Aranavirus
- Aranbvirus
- Aranruthvirus
- Arawnvirus
- Arawsmovirus
- Archimedesvirus
- Arctuvirus
- Arepavirus
- Arequatrovirus
- Aresaunavirus
- Arihsbuvirus
- Arlivirus
- Armstrongvirus
- Arnorvirus
- Arpirivirus
- Arsenicumvirus
- Arsyunavirus
- Artiparvovirus
- Arurhavirus
- Arvduovirus
- Aryavirus
- Ascovirus
- Asfivirus
- Ashcevirus
- Ashduovirus
- Ashivirus
- Ashucavirus
- Asteriusvirus
- Astrithrvirus
- Atadenovirus
- Atlauavirus
- Atraxavirus
- Attisvirus
- Attoomivirus
- Atuphduovirus
- Audreyjarvisvirus
- Aumaivirus
- Aureusvirus
- Auricularimonavirus
- Aurivirus
- Aurodevirus
- Aurunvirus
- Austintatiousvirus
- Avanivirus
- Avastrovirus
- Avenavirus
- Aveparvovirus
- Avesvirus
- Aviadenovirus
- Avibirnavirus
- Avihepadnavirus
- Avihepatovirus
- Avihepevirus
- Avipoxvirus
- Avisivirus
- Avocadovirus
- Avsunviroid
- Avunavirus
- Axeltriavirus
- Axomammavirus
- Ayakvirus
- Ayaqvirus
- Ayohtrevirus
- Azorudivirus

== B ==
- Babosmacovirus
- Babusatellite
- Babuvirus
- Bacelvirus
- Bacillarnavirus
- Backyardiganvirus
- Badaguanvirus
- Badaztecvirus
- Badnavirus
- Bafinivirus
- Bahdevuvirus
- Bahnicevirus
- Bahscuvirus
- Baikalvirus
- Baileybluvirus
- Bakolyvirus
- Baltimorevirus
- Baltivirus
- Banchanvirus
- Bandavirus
- Banmivirus
- Bantamvirus
- Baoshanvirus
- Barbavirus
- Barhavirus
- Barnavirus
- Barnyardvirus
- Bartonegtaviriform
- Basiliskvirus
- Bastillevirus
- Bathrivirus
- Batravirus
- Bavovirus
- Baxterfoxvirus
- Baylorvirus
- Bcepfunavirus
- Bcepmuvirus
- Bdellomicrovirus
- Beceayunavirus
- Becedseptimavirus
- Becurtovirus
- Beecentumtrevirus
- Beejeyvirus
- Beenievirus
- Beetrevirus
- Begomovirus
- Behevivirus
- Behlfluvirus
- Behunavirus
- Beidivirus
- Belbovirus
- Bellamyvirus
- Bembunaquatrovirus
- Bendigovirus
- Benedictvirus
- Benyvirus
- Beograduvirus
- Bequatrovirus
- Berdovirus
- Berhavirus
- Berlinvirus
- Bernalvirus
- Bertavirus
- Bertelyvirus
- Beshanovirus
- Besingivirus
- Betaarterivirus
- Betabaculovirus
- Betabotoulivirus
- Betacarmovirus
- Betachrysovirus
- Betacoronavirus
- Betadintovirus
- Betaendornavirus
- Betaentomopoxvirus
- Betafusarivirus
- Betafusellovirus
- Betaguttavirus
- Betahymrhavirus
- Betahypovirus
- Betainfluenzavirus
- Betalipothrixvirus
- Betanecrovirus
- Betanemrhavirus
- Betanodavirus
- Betanucleorhabdovirus
- Betanudivirus
- Betapapillomavirus
- Betapaprhavirus
- Betapartitivirus
- Betapleolipovirus
- Betapolyomavirus
- Betaretrovirus
- Betarhizoulivirus
- Betaricinrhavirus
- Betasatellite
- Betascleroulivirus
- Betatectivirus
- Betatetravirus
- Betatorquevirus
- Betatristromavirus
- Betayadokarivirus
- Betterkatzvirus
- Bevemovirus
- Biavirus
- Bicaudavirus
- Bicehmovirus
- Bidensovirus
- Bidhavirus
- Bielevirus
- Bievrevirus
- Bifilivirus
- Bifseptvirus
- Bigmanorsvirus
- Bignuzvirus
- Bihdovirus
- Bilifuvirus
- Bingvirus
- Bippervirus
- Biquartavirus
- Birdsnestvirus
- Birpovirus
- Bisdanovirus
- Biseptimavirus
- Bixiavirus
- Bixzunavirus
- Bjornvirus
- Blafavirus
- Blattambidensovirus
- Blinduvirus
- Blohavirus
- Blosnavirus
- Blunervirus
- Bluvavirus
- Bocaparvovirus
- Bocovirus
- Bohnovirus
- Bohwovirus
- Bohxovirus
- Bolenivirus
- Boloprevirus
- Bonaevitaevirus
- Bonghivirus
- Bongovirus
- Bonnellvirus
- Bonzesmacovirus
- Boosepivirus
- Bopivirus
- Borockvirus
- Bosavirus
- Boschuvirus
- Boscovirus
- Bossavirus
- Bostasmacovirus
- Bostovirus
- Botoulivirus
- Botrexvirus
- Botrytimonavirus
- Bottigliavirus
- Botybirnavirus
- Bovismacovirus
- Bovispumavirus
- Bowservirus
- Bracchivirus
- Brachyspigtaviriform
- Bracoviriform
- Bragavirus
- Brambyvirus
- Branisovskavirus
- Breudwovirus
- Brevihamaparvovirus
- Bridgettevirus
- Brigitvirus
- Brikhyavirus
- Bristolvirus
- Britbratvirus
- Brizovirus
- Broinstvirus
- Bromdenvirus
- Bromovirus
- Bronvirus
- Brucesealvirus
- Brudgevirus
- Brujitavirus
- Brunovirus
- Brussowvirus
- Bruynoghevirus
- Buchananvirus
- Buchavirus
- Bucovirus
- Buhdavirus
- Buhlduvirus
- Bundooravirus
- Buorbuivirus
- Burrovirus
- Burzaovirus
- Busanvirus
- Bymovirus
- Byrnievirus

== C ==
- Cacepaovirus
- Caecilivirus
- Caelumvirus
- Caeruleovirus
- Cahdavirus
- Cahrlavirus
- Cahrpivirus
- Cahtavirus
- Cahtebovirus
- Caligrhavirus
- Callevirus
- Caloevirus
- Caminolopintovirus
- Campanilevirus
- Camtrevirus
- Camvirus
- Canhaevirus
- Canoevirus
- Cantarevirus
- Capillovirus
- Capistrivirus
- Capnelvirus
- Capripoxvirus
- Captovirus
- Capulavirus
- Capvunavirus
- Carbovirus
- Cardiovirus
- Cardoreovirus
- Carettavirus
- Carjivirus
- Carlavirus
- Carltongylesvirus
- Carmenvirus
- Carnodivirus
- Caroctavirus
- Carpasinavirus
- Carvajevirus
- Casadabanvirus
- Catalunyavirus
- Catfishvirus
- Catindovirus
- Cauhldivirus
- Caulimovirus
- Cavemovirus
- Cavevirus
- Cbastvirus
- Cbunavirus
- Cebadecemvirus
- Cebevirus
- Ceceduovirus
- Cecivirus
- Cedarrivervirus
- Ceduovirus
- Ceetrepovirus
- Cehakivirus
- Cehntrovirus
- Celavirus
- Celiavirus
- Cellubavirus
- Cenphatecvirus
- Centapoxvirus
- Cepunavirus
- Cequinquevirus
- Certevirus
- Certrevirus
- Cervidpoxvirus
- Cetarhavirus
- Cetovirus
- Chaedoavirus
- Chahsmivirus
- Chakrabartyvirus
- Chalconvirus
- Changchunvirus
- Chaoshanvirus
- Chaovirus
- Chaphamaparvovirus
- Charlievirus
- Charybdisvirus
- Charybdivirus
- Charybnivirus
- Chatterjeevirus
- Chenonavirus
- Cheoctovirus
- Cheravirus
- Chertseyvirus
- Cheungvirus
- Chiangmaivirus
- Chidieberevirus
- Chihyovirus
- Chimpavirus
- Chimshavirus
- Chinihovirus
- Chipapillomavirus
- Chipolycivirus
- Chirohepevirus
- Chitorquevirus
- Chivirus
- Chlamydiamicrovirus
- Chloriridovirus
- Chlorovirus
- Chlurivirus
- Chobevirus
- Choctavirus
- Chopinvirus
- Chordovirus
- Chorovirus
- Chosvirus
- Chounavirus
- Christensenvirus
- Chrysonvirus
- Chuhaivirus
- Chunghsingvirus
- Chuvivirus
- Cicadellivirus
- Cihsnivirus
- Cilevirus
- Cimandefvirus
- Cimpunavirus
- Cinqassovirus
- Cintrevirus
- Cinunavirus
- Circovirus
- Citexvirus
- Citlodavirus
- Citricivirus
- Citrivirus
- Citrovirus
- Clampvirus
- Claudivirus
- Clavavirus
- Clawzvirus
- Clecrusatellite
- Clitovirus
- Closterovirus
- Clostunsatellite
- Clownvirus
- Coatlandelriovirus
- Cobrasixvirus
- Cocadviroid
- Coccolithovirus
- Cocosatellite
- Coetzeevirus
- Coeurvirus
- Cofodevirus
- Coguvirus
- Cohcovirus
- Cohrdavirus
- Colecusatellite
- Coleviroid
- Colneyvirus
- Colossusvirus
- Coltivirus
- Colunavirus
- Comovirus
- Condavirus
- Controvirus
- Coopervirus
- Copasivirus
- Copernicusvirus
- Copiparvovirus
- Coprasatellite
- Coralvirus
- Coriovirus
- Corndogvirus
- Cornellvirus
- Cornievirus
- Corticovirus
- Coruscantvirus
- Cosavirus
- Cosmacovirus
- Cotonvirus
- Coventryvirus
- Crahelivirus
- Craquatrovirus
- Creshivirus
- Crifsvirus
- Crinivirus
- Cripavirus
- Crocodylidpoxvirus
- Crohivirus
- Cronosvirus
- Cronusvirus
- Crustavirus
- Cryspovirus
- Cuauhnahuacvirus
- Cuauhtlivirus
- Cucumovirus
- Cuernavacavirus
- Cuevavirus
- Cukevirus
- Culicidavirus
- Culoivirus
- Cultervirus
- Cunarovirus
- Cunavirus
- Curiovirus
- Curtovirus
- Cyamitesvirus
- Cybitervirus
- Cyclitvirus
- Cyclophivirus
- Cyclovirus
- Cymopoleiavirus
- Cynoglossusvirus
- Cypovirus
- Cystovirus
- Cytomegalovirus
- Cytorhabdovirus
- Cyvirus

== D ==
* Daazvirus
- Dabirmavirus
- Daemvirus
- Dagavirus
- Dagazvirus
- Dahmuivirus
- Dahmuvirus
- Dalettorquevirus
- Daletvirus
- Dalianvirus
- Dalvirus
- Damravirus
- Danipivirus
- Daphniairidovirus
- Dardanusvirus
- Daredevilvirus
- Darnbovirus
- Decadevirus
- Decapodiridovirus
- Dechshavirus
- Decurrovirus
- Deepoceanvirus
- Deevirus
- Dehcevirus
- Dehgumevirus
- Dehkhevirus
- Delepquintavirus
- Delislevirus
- Delmidovirus
- Deltaarterivirus
- Deltabaculovirus
- Deltacoronavirus
- Deltaentomopoxvirus
- Deltaflexivirus
- Deltahypovirus
- Deltainfluenzavirus
- Deltalipothrixvirus
- Deltanudivirus
- Deltapapillomavirus
- Deltapartitivirus
- Deltapolyomavirus
- Deltaretrovirus
- Deltasatellite
- Deltascleroulivirus
- Deltatectivirus
- Deltatorquevirus
- Deltavirus
- Delusorvirus
- Demapteravirus
- Demiitzamnavirus
- Demosthenesvirus
- Dendoorenvirus
- Denfovirus
- Denisevirus
- Denvervirus
- Depandovirus
- Dependoparvovirus
- Derbicusvirus
- Deseoctovirus
- Detrevirus
- Deurplevirus
- Dexdertvirus
- Dhakavirus
- Dhillonvirus
- Dianlovirus
- Dianthovirus
- Diatodnavirus
- Dibaevirus
- Dibbivirus
- Dichorhavirus
- Diciambidensovirus
- Dicipivirus
- Diegovirus
- Dihsdivirus
- Dilzevirus
- Dinavirus
- Dinodnavirus
- Dinogtaviriform
- Dinornavirus
- Dinovernavirus
- Diorhovirus
- Dioscovirus
- Diresapivirus
- Dismasvirus
- Divavirus
- Diydovirus
- Dobrovirus
- Dohlivirus
- Dohnjavirus
- Doliuvirus
- Dolusvirus
- Donellivirus
- Dongdastvirus
- Dorisvirus
- Dosmizivirus
- Doucettevirus
- Douglaswolinvirus
- Doupovirus
- Dpdavirus
- Draflysatellite
- Dragolirvirus
- Dragsmacovirus
- Draselvirus
- Drivevirus
- Dronavirus
- Drosmacovirus
- Drulisvirus
- Drunivirus
- Duamitovirus
- Dubowvirus
- Dubuvirus
- Dugnivirus
- Duhcivirus
- Dunedinvirus
- Duodecimduovirus
- Duonihilunusvirus
- Dybvigvirus
- Dyochipapillomavirus
- Dyodeltapapillomavirus
- Dyoepsilonpapillomavirus
- Dyoetapapillomavirus
- Dyoiotapapillomavirus
- Dyokappapapillomavirus
- Dyolambdapapillomavirus
- Dyomupapillomavirus
- Dyonupapillomavirus
- Dyoomegapapillomavirus
- Dyoomikronpapillomavirus
- Dyophipapillomavirus
- Dyopipapillomavirus
- Dyopsipapillomavirus
- Dyorhopapillomavirus
- Dyosigmapapillomavirus
- Dyotaupapillomavirus
- Dyothetapapillomavirus
- Dyoupsilonpapillomavirus
- Dyoxipapillomavirus
- Dyozetapapillomavirus

== E ==
- Eagleeyevirus
- Eapunavirus
- Eastlansingvirus
- Eceepunavirus
- Eclunavirus
- Edenvirus
- Efbeekayvirus
- Efekovirus
- Efquatrovirus
- Eganvirus
- Eiauvirus
- Eilatmyovirus
- Eisenstarkvirus
- Elaviroid
- Eldridgevirus
- Electravirus
- Elemovirus
- Elerivirus
- Elmenteitavirus
- Elpedvirus
- Elunavirus
- Elveevirus
- Elvirus
- Emalynvirus
- Emaravirus
- Emcearvirus
- Emdodecavirus
- Emesvirus
- Emnonavirus
- Emperorvirus
- Empivirus
- Enamovirus
- Enchivirus
- Endehruvirus
- Endlipuvirus
- Eneladusvirus
- Enfavirus
- Enhodamvirus
- Enquatrovirus
- Enterogokushovirus
- Enterovirus
- Entnonagintavirus
- Entomobirnavirus
- Entovirus
- Eosonovirus
- Eowynvirus
- Epaquintavirus
- Ephemerovirus
- Eponavirus
- Epseptimavirus
- Epsilonarterivirus
- Epsilonhypovirus
- Epsilonpapillomavirus
- Epsilonpolyomavirus
- Epsilonretrovirus
- Epsilonscleroulivirus
- Epsilontectivirus
- Epsilontorquevirus
- Equispumavirus
- Eracentumvirus
- Eragrovirus
- Erbovirus
- Eregrovirus
- Ericdabvirus
- Erimutivirus
- Ermolevavirus
- Errantivirus
- Erskinevirus
- Erythroparvovirus
- Espurtavirus
- Etaarterivirus
- Etahypovirus
- Etapapillomavirus
- Etapolyomavirus
- Etatorquevirus
- Etdyvivirus
- Eurybiavirus
- Evevirus
- Exceevirus
- Eyrevirus

== F ==
- Fabavirus
- Fabenesatellite
- Fadolivirus
- Fagihovirus
- Fagihyuvirus
- Fahrmivirus
- Fairfaxidumvirus
- Faithunavirus
- Fajavirus
- Farahnazvirus
- Fattrevirus
- Faunusvirus
- Faustvirus
- Febihevirus
- Fejonovirus
- Felipivirus
- Felismacovirus
- Felispumavirus
- Felixounavirus
- Felsduovirus
- Fengtaivirus
- Feofaniavirus
- Ferahgovirus
- Feravirus
- Ferlavirus
- Fernvirus
- Ferozepurvirus
- Fibralongavirus
- Fibrovirus
- Ficleduovirus
- Fijivirus
- Finchvirus
- Finnlakevirus
- Finvirus
- Fionnbharthvirus
- Fipivirus
- Fipvunavirus
- Firavirus
- Firehammervirus
- Firingavirus
- Firunevirus
- Fischettivirus
- Fishburnevirus
- Fiyodovirus
- Flagovirus
- Flaumdravirus
- Fletchervirus
- Flowerpowervirus
- Fluruvirus
- Foetvirus
- Fohxhuevirus
- Formivirus
- Forzavirus
- Foturvirus
- Foussvirus
- Foveavirus
- Fowlmouthvirus
- Foxborovirus
- Foxquatrovirus
- Foxunavirus
- Franklinbayvirus
- Fraservirus
- Fremauxvirus
- Freyavirus
- Friunavirus
- Frobavirus
- Fromanvirus
- Fudhoevirus
- Fukuivirus
- Furovirus
- Fussvirus

== G ==
- Gahlinevirus
- Gahlovirus
- Gahmegovirus
- Gaiavirus
- Gajwadongvirus
- Galateavirus
- Galaxyvirus
- Galenevirus
- Gallantivirus
- Gallivirus
- Galunavirus
- Galvastonvirus
- Galvornvirus
- Gamaleyavirus
- Gambievirus
- Gammaarterivirus
- Gammabaculovirus
- Gammacarmovirus
- Gammacoronavirus
- Gammaentomopoxvirus
- Gammaflexivirus
- Gammafusarivirus
- Gammahypovirus
- Gammainfluenzavirus
- Gammanucleorhabdovirus
- Gammanudivirus
- Gammapapillomavirus
- Gammapartitivirus
- Gammapleolipovirus
- Gammapolyomavirus
- Gammaretrovirus
- Gammascleroulivirus
- Gammatectivirus
- Gammatorquevirus
- Gamtrevirus
- Ganiavirus
- Gaprivervirus
- Garnievirus
- Garovuvirus
- Gaunavirus
- Gediminasvirus
- Gegavirus
- Gegevirus
- Gehnevirus
- Gehrmavirus
- Gelderlandvirus
- Gemsvirus
- Gemycircularvirus
- Gemyduguivirus
- Gemygorvirus
- Gemykibivirus
- Gemykolovirus
- Gemykrogvirus
- Gemykroznavirus
- Gemytondvirus
- Gemytripvirus
- Gemyvongvirus
- Gequatrovirus
- Gernuduvirus
- Gervaisevirus
- Gesputvirus
- Getalongvirus
- Getseptimavirus
- Ghobesvirus
- Ghunavirus
- Giardiavirus
- Gibbetvirus
- Gifriavirus
- Gihfavirus
- Gilesvirus
- Gillianvirus
- Gilsonvirus
- Gimaduovirus
- Gimeltorquevirus
- Gladiatorvirus
- Glaedevirus
- Glamdringvirus
- Glaucusvirus
- Glazvirus
- Glincaevirus
- Glossinavirus
- Glyciruvirus
- Gmuhndevirus
- Godonkavirus
- Goettingenvirus
- Gofduovirus
- Gohshovirus
- Gonggongvirus
- Goodmanvirus
- Goravirus
- Gordonvirus
- Gordtnkvirus
- Gorganvirus
- Gorjumvirus
- Gorodievirus
- Goslarvirus
- Gosmusatellite
- Goukovirus
- Grablovirus
- Graikaemvirus
- Gredihovirus
- Greenvirus
- Gregsiragusavirus
- Grendvuvirus
- Grisebachstrassevirus
- Grondvirus
- Gruhelivirus
- Grusopivirus
- Grutrevirus
- Gruunavirus
- Gualtarvirus
- Guelphvirus
- Gulmivirus
- Gunawavirus
- Gundelvirus
- Gustavvirus
- Gutovirus
- Gwanakrovirus
- Gyeongsanvirus
- Gylbovirus
- Gyrovirus

== H ==
- Habenivirus
- Hacavirus
- Hacihdavirus
- Hadakavirus
- Hadassahvirus
- Haetaevirus
- Hagavirus
- Hagravirus
- Hahdsevirus
- Hahkesevirus
- Haifavirus
- Halcalevirus
- Halcyonevirus
- Haloferacalesvirus
- Halohivirus
- Hanrivervirus
- Hapavirus
- Hapunavirus
- Harambevirus
- Harbinvirus
- Harkavirus
- Harrekavirus
- Harrisonburgvirus
- Harrisonvirus
- Hartmanivirus
- Hatrivirus
- Hattifnattvirus
- Hautrevirus
- Hawkeyevirus
- Hedwigvirus
- Hehrovirus
- Hehspivirus
- Heilongjiangvirus
- Helacdivirus
- Heliosvirus
- Helsettvirus
- Helsingorvirus
- Hemiambidensovirus
- Hemipivirus
- Hemipvirus
- Hemivirus
- Hemphillvirus
- Henifovirus
- Henipavirus
- Henunavirus
- Henuseptimavirus
- Hepacivirus
- Hepanhamaparvovirus
- Hepatovirus
- Herbevirus
- Herpetohepadnavirus
- Herugrimvirus
- Hestiavirus
- Hetorquevirus
- Heverleevirus
- Hexartovirus
- Hicfunavirus
- Higashivirus
- Higrevirus
- Hihdivirus
- Hinehbovirus
- Hiroshimavirus
- Hirvovirus
- Hiyaavirus
- Hnatkovirus
- Hohglivirus
- Hohltdevirus
- Hohrdovirus
- Hollowayvirus
- Holosalinivirus
- Homburgvirus
- Homochaacvirus
- Hongcheonvirus
- Hopescreekvirus
- Hoplichthysvirus
- Hoptevirus
- Hordeivirus
- Horusvirus
- Horwuvirus
- Hostuviroid
- Hoswirudivirus
- Howevirus
- Hpunavirus
- Huanghaivirus
- Huangshavirus
- Hubavirus
- Hubeivirus
- Hubramonavirus
- Huchismacovirus
- Hudivirus
- Hudovirus
- Huelvavirus
- Huhbevirus
- Huhmpluvirus
- Hukohnovirus
- Hukuchivirus
- Huleruivirus
- Hungariovirus
- Hunnivirus
- Huohcivirus
- Hupolycivirus
- Huylevirus
- Hyjrovirus
- Hylipavirus
- Hymovirus
- Hysdruvirus
- Hzauvirus

== I ==
- Iaduovirus
- Iapetusvirus
- Icepovirus
- Icerudivirus
- Ichnoviriform
- Ichonovirus
- Ichtadenovirus
- Ichtchaphamaparvovirus
- Ictavirus
- Icumivirus
- Idaeovirus
- Ideskevirus
- Idnoreovirus
- Iflavirus
- Iggyvirus
- Igirivirus
- Ikedavirus
- Ilarvirus
- Illuinvirus
- Iltovirus
- Ilzatvirus
- Imeberivirus
- Immanueltrevirus
- Immutovirus
- Imvubuvirus
- Inbricusvirus
- Incheonvirus
- Indlulamithivirus
- Ineyimevirus
- Infratovirus
- Infulavirus
- Ingelinevirus
- Inhavirus
- Innesvirus
- Innmovirus
- Inovirus
- Inpeasmacovirus
- Insbruvirus
- Intasivirus
- Invictavirus
- Iodovirus
- Ionavirus
- Iotaarterivirus
- Iotapapillomavirus
- Iotatorquevirus
- Ipivevirus
- Ipomovirus
- Iridovirus
- Irrigatiovirus
- Irtavirus
- Iruqauvirus
- Isavirus
- Ishigurovirus
- Ishugivirus
- Isoihlovirus
- Isoldevirus
- Itarudivirus
- Iteradensovirus
- Ithacavirus
- Ittyvirus
- Ivolevirus
- Iwahcevirus
- Ixovirus

== J ==
- Jacevirus
- Jacunavirus
- Jahgtovirus
- Jalkavirus
- Jamesmcgillvirus
- Janusvirus
- Japarudivirus
- Jargovirus
- Jarilovirus
- Jarrellvirus
- Jasminevirus
- Jedunavirus
- Jeilongvirus
- Jelitavirus
- Jenstvirus
- Jeonjuvirus
- Jerseyvirus
- Jesfedecavirus
- Jhansiroadvirus
- Jiangsuvirus
- Jiaodavirus
- Jiaoyazivirus
- Jiesduavirus
- Jiforsuvirus
- Jilinvirus
- Jimmervirus
- Johnovirus
- Johnsonvirus
- Jolieduovirus
- Jonvirus
- Jouyvirus
- Juiceboxvirus
- Jujuvirus
- Julieunavirus
- Junavirus
- Junduvirus
- Jupbevirus
- Justusliebigvirus
- Jwalphavirus

== K ==
- Kablunavirus
- Kafavirus
- Kafunavirus
- Kagamiyamavirus
- Kagunavirus
- Kahfsdivirus
- Kahnayevirus
- Kahnovirus
- Kahraivirus
- Kahshuvirus
- Kahucivirus
- Kairosalinivirus
- Kajamvirus
- Kakivirus
- Kalppathivirus
- Kamchatkavirus
- Kanagawavirus
- Kanaloavirus
- Kantovirus
- Kaohsiungvirus
- Kapieceevirus
- Kappaarterivirus
- Kappapapillomavirus
- Kappatorquevirus
- Karamvirus
- Karezivirus
- Karimacvirus
- Kayeltresvirus
- Kayfunavirus
- Kaypoctavirus
- Kayvirus
- Kecijavirus
- Kecuhnavirus
- Keghovirus
- Kehishuvirus
- Kehmevirus
- Kehruavirus
- Keisodnavirus
- Kelleziovirus
- Kelmasvirus
- Kelquatrovirus
- Kembevirus
- Kemicevirus
- Kemiovirus
- Kempsvovirus
- Kenamavirus
- Kenoshavirus
- Kenyattavirus
- Kerishovirus
- Keshuvirus
- Keylargovirus
- Khurdivirus
- Kieseladnavirus
- Kihrivirus
- Kihryuvirus
- Kihsiravirus
- Kilunavirus
- Kimihcavirus
- Kimonavirus
- Kingevirus
- Kinglevirus
- Kirikabuvirus
- Kirnavirus
- Kirovvirus
- Kisinvirus
- Kisquattuordecimvirus
- Kisquinquevirus
- Kiwsmaevirus
- Klausavirus
- Kleczkowskavirus
- Klementvirus
- Klosterneuburgvirus
- Klumppvirus
- Knuthellervirus
- Kobbarisatellite
- Kobuvirus
- Kochikohdavirus
- Kochitakasuvirus
- Kohmavirus
- Kojivirus
- Kokobelvirus
- Kolesnikvirus
- Kolpuevirus
- Konkivirus
- Konmavirus
- Konstantinevirus
- Korravirus
- Kostyavirus
- Kotilavirus
- Koutsourovirus
- Kowinovirus
- Kozyakovvirus
- Krakvirus
- Krampusvirus
- Kratiovirus
- Kratosvirus
- Krischvirus
- Kroosvirus
- Krylovvirus
- Kryptosalinivirus
- Kudohovirus
- Kuhfotivirus
- Kuhshuvirus
- Kujavirus
- Kukrinivirus
- Kukulkanvirus
- Kuleanavirus
- Kumaovirus
- Kumottavirus
- Kungbxnavirus
- Kunmingvirus
- Kunsagivirus
- Kuravirus
- Kusarnavirus
- Kuttervirus
- Kvaramitovirus
- Kwaitsingvirus
- Kyanivirus
- Kylevirus
- Kyungwonvirus

== L ==
- Labanvirus
- Labyrnavirus
- Lacnuvirus
- Lacusarxvirus
- Lafunavirus
- Lagaffevirus
- Lagovirus
- Lahcomavirus
- Lahexavirus
- Lahndsivirus
- Laimuvirus
- Lakivirus
- Lambavirus
- Lambdaarterivirus
- Lambdapapillomavirus
- Lambdatorquevirus
- Lambdavirus
- Lambovirus
- Laminvirus
- Lanavirus
- Larmunavirus
- Laroyevirus
- Lasallevirus
- Lastavirus
- Latrobevirus
- Laulavirus
- Lauvirus
- Lavrentievavirus
- Lazarusvirus
- Lazuovirus
- Lebriduvirus
- Ledantevirus
- Lederbergvirus
- Leefvirus
- Lehptavirus
- Lehptevirus
- Leicestervirus
- Leishmaniavirus
- Lentavirus
- Lentimonavirus
- Lentinuvirus
- Lentivirus
- Lenusvirus
- Leocovirus
- Leonardvirus
- Leporipoxvirus
- Lessievirus
- Leucotheavirus
- Libanvirus
- Libingvirus
- Lidleunavirus
- Liebevirus
- Liefievirus
- Lietduovirus
- Lightbulbvirus
- Lihvevirus
- Likavirus
- Lilbeanievirus
- Lillamyvirus
- Lilmcdreamyvirus
- Lilyvirus
- Limaivirus
- Limdunavirus
- Limelightvirus
- Limestonevirus
- Limnipivirus
- Lincruvirus
- Lindendrivevirus
- Lineavirus
- Lingvirus
- Lipsvirus
- Lirnavirus
- Lirvirus
- Littlefixvirus
- Litunavirus
- Livupivirus
- Livvievirus
- Llyrvirus
- Loanvirus
- Lobdovirus
- Locarnavirus
- Loessnervirus
- Lohmavirus
- Lokivirus
- Lolavirus
- Lomnativirus
- Lomovskayavirus
- Lonfivirus
- Longwoodvirus
- Lonzbavirus
- Lophivirus
- Loptevirus
- Loriparvovirus
- Loslovirus
- Lostrhavirus
- Loudonvirus
- Loughboroughvirus
- Lowelvirus
- Lubbockvirus
- Luchadorvirus
- Luckybarnesvirus
- Luckytenvirus
- Ludhianavirus
- Ludopivirus
- Lughvirus
- Lullwatervirus
- Luloavirus
- Lulohlevirus
- Lumosvirus
- Luteovirus
- Luthavirus
- Luzseptimavirus
- Lwoffvirus
- Lyctovirus
- Lygehevirus
- Lymphocryptovirus
- Lymphocystivirus
- Lyndovirus
- Lyssavirus

== M ==
- Maaswegvirus
- Macanavirus
- Macariavirus
- Macavirus
- Macdonaldcampvirus
- Machinavirus
- Machlomovirus
- Macluravirus
- Macronovirus
- Macropopoxvirus
- Maculavirus
- Maculvirus
- Madalivirus
- Madisduvirus
- Maenadvirus
- Magadivirus
- Magiavirus
- Magoulivirus
- Mahdsavirus
- Mahjnavirus
- Mahlunavirus
- Mahqeavirus
- Mahrahovirus
- Mahraivirus
- Mahshuvirus
- Mahstovirus
- Majavirus
- Makaravirus
- Makelovirus
- Malagasivirus
- Maldovirus
- Maltschvirus
- Mamastrovirus
- Mammarenavirus
- Manhattanvirus
- Manohtivirus
- Manovirus
- Manrohovirus
- Manticavirus
- Manuelvirus
- Mapvirus
- Marafivirus
- Mardecavirus
- Mardivirus
- Mareflavirus
- Marfavirus
- Marienburgvirus
- Marnavirus
- Marseillevirus
- Marskhivirus
- Marsupivirus
- Martavirus
- Marthavirus
- Marvinvirus
- Mastadenovirus
- Mastrevirus
- Matervirus
- Mathaucavirus
- Matsuvirus
- Mavirus
- Maxdohrnvirus
- Maxrubnervirus
- Mazarbulvirus
- Mazuvirus
- Mcgonagallvirus
- Meadowvirus
- Meblowovirus
- Mechlorovirus
- Medusavirus
- Megabirnavirus
- Megalocytivirus
- Megavirus
- Megrivirus
- Mehraxmevirus
- Meihzavirus
- Mekintivirus
- Melvirus
- Mementomorivirus
- Menderavirus
- Menegrothvirus
- Menthavirus
- Merhavirus
- Mersinvirus
- Metaavulavirus
- Metahepadnavirus
- Metalloincertoparvovirus
- Metamorphoovirus
- Metapneumovirus
- Metavirus
- Metforvirus
- Methovirus
- Metrivirus
- Metsavirus
- Mexirudivirus
- Mguuvirus
- Miamivirus
- Micavirus
- Microwolfvirus
- Midgardsormrvirus
- Mieseafarmvirus
- Mihkrovirus
- Milihnovirus
- Miltoncavirus
- Miltonvirus
- Milvetsatellite
- Mimasvirus
- Mimivirus
- Mimoreovirus
- Mincapvirus
- Mingyongvirus
- Minhovirus
- Miniambidensovirus
- Minipunavirus
- Minorvirus
- Minovirus
- Mintinovirus
- Mintuvirus
- Minunavirus
- Minusuvirus
- Mischivirus
- Mitdiwavirus
- Mithrilvirus
- Mivedwarsatellite
- Mivirus
- Moabitevirus
- Moazamivirus
- Mobatvirus
- Mobuvirus
- Mocruvirus
- Mohonavirus
- Moineauvirus
- Molluscipoxvirus
- Mollymurvirus
- Mollyvirus
- Moloevirus
- Molucevirus
- Monamovirus
- Monekavirus
- Montyvirus
- Mooglevirus
- Moomoovirus
- Moonbeamvirus
- Moonvirus
- Mooreparkvirus
- Moovirus
- Morbillivirus
- Morsusvirus
- Mosavirus
- Mosigvirus
- Mosugukvirus
- Moturavirus
- Moumouvirus
- Mousrhavirus
- Muarterivirus
- Mucrahivirus
- Mudcatvirus
- Mufasoctovirus
- Mukerjeevirus
- Mulcrilevirus
- Muldoonvirus
- Muminvirus
- Mupapillomavirus
- Mupivirus
- Murciavirus
- Muromegalovirus
- Murrayvirus
- Muscarsatellite
- Muscavirus
- Muscodensovirus
- Mushuvirus
- Mustelpoxvirus
- Mutorquevirus
- Muvirus
- Muyegivirus
- Mycoabscvirus
- Mycoflexivirus
- Mycoreovirus
- Mydovirus
- Myducvirus
- Mykissvirus
- Mylasvirus
- Myoalterovirus
- Myohalovirus
- Myosmarvirus
- Myradeevirus
- Myriavirus
- Myrnavirus
- Myrropivirus
- Myunavirus
- Myxoctovirus

== N ==
- Nacovirus
- Nadsecevirus
- Naesvirus
- Nahantvirus
- Nahjiuvirus
- Nahrudavirus
- Nahsuvirus
- Namakavirus
- Namazuvirus
- Nampongvirus
- Nanhaivirus
- Nanhuvirus
- Nankokuvirus
- Nanovirus
- Napahaivirus
- Narmovirus
- Narnavirus
- Nasenivirus
- Natevirus
- Nauglamirvirus
- Nazgulvirus
- Nebovirus
- Neferthenavirus
- Negarvirus
- Nehohpavirus
- Nehpavirus
- Nehujevirus
- Nehumivirus
- Nekkelsvirus
- Nematovirus
- Nepovirus
- Neptunevirus
- Neratovirus
- Nereusvirus
- Neritesvirus
- Nerrivikvirus
- Nesevirus
- Nevevirus
- Nevillevirus
- Newforgelanevirus
- Nezavisimistyvirus
- Niankuvirus
- Nicedsevirus
- Nickievirus
- Nieuwekanaalvirus
- Nigecruvirus
- Niginuvirus
- Nihlwovirus
- Nihucivirus
- Nilusvirus
- Nimanivirus
- Nimduovirus
- Nimphelosvirus
- Ningirsuvirus
- Nipunavirus
- Nitmarvirus
- Nitunavirus
- Niuhvovirus
- Noahvirus
- Nochtlivirus
- Nodensvirus
- Noehsivirus
- Nohelivirus
- Nohivirus
- Nonagvirus
- Nonanavirus
- Norovirus
- Northamptonvirus
- Norwavirus
- Nouzillyvirus
- Novemvirus
- Novirhabdovirus
- Novosibovirus
- Novosibvirus
- Noxifervirus
- Nuarterivirus
- Nuihimevirus
- Nupapillomavirus
- Nutorquevirus
- Nyavirus
- Nyceiraevirus
- Nyfulvavirus
- Nylescharonvirus
- Nymphadoravirus

== O ==
- Obhoarovirus
- Oblavirus
- Obolenskvirus
- Obscuruvirus
- Oceanusvirus
- Oceshuvirus
- Ocetevirus
- Ociwvivirus
- Octobienvirus
- Odiravirus
- Odonatavirus
- Oekfovirus
- Oengusvirus
- Ohlsrhavirus
- Oinezvirus
- Okavirus
- Okubovirus
- Oleavirus
- Olivavirus
- Oliverunavirus
- Ollusvirus
- Olmsdivirus
- Omarvirus
- Omegapapillomavirus
- Omegatetravirus
- Omegatorquevirus
- Omegavirus
- Omicrontorquevirus
- Omikronpapillomavirus
- Omohevirus
- Oncotshavirus
- Oneupvirus
- Onohmuvirus
- Onyinyevirus
- Opdykovirus
- Ophiovirus
- Opunvirus
- Orbivirus
- Orchidvirus
- Orinovirus
- Orivirus
- Ormalvirus
- Ormenosvirus
- Orthoavulavirus
- Orthobornavirus
- Orthobunyavirus
- Orthocurvulavirus
- Orthodiscovirus
- Orthoebolavirus
- Orthoflavivirus
- Orthohantavirus
- Orthohepadnavirus
- Orthomarburgvirus
- Orthonairovirus
- Orthonoravirus
- Orthophasmavirus
- Orthopicobirnavirus
- Orthopneumovirus
- Orthopoxvirus
- Orthoreovirus
- Orthorubulavirus
- Orthotospovirus
- Orthotulasvirus
- Oryzavirus
- Oryzopoxvirus
- Oscivirus
- Oshimavirus
- Osigowavirus
- Oslovirus
- Ostreavirus
- Otagovirus
- Ourmiavirus
- Owenocuvirus
- Oxychlovirus

== P ==
- Paadamvirus
- Pacehavirus
- Pacinivirus
- Paclarkvirus
- Pacuvirus
- Pagavirus
- Pagevirus
- Pagohnivirus
- Paguronivirus
- Pahdacivirus
- Pahexavirus
- Pahsextavirus
- Pahspavirus
- Pairvirus
- Pakpunavirus
- Palaemonvirus
- Palantirivirus
- Palsdevirus
- Pamexvirus
- Pamirivirus
- Panicovirus
- Panjvirus
- Pankowvirus
- Paopuvirus
- Papanivirus
- Papyrusvirus
- Paraavulavirus
- Parabovirus
- Parahepadnavirus
- Parapoxvirus
- Pararubulavirus
- Parechovirus
- Parhipatevirus
- Pariacacavirus
- Parlovirus
- Pasivirus
- Paslahepevirus
- Passerivirus
- Patagivirus
- Patiencevirus
- Patimovirus
- Paulavirus
- Paundecimvirus
- Paundivirus
- Pavtokvirus
- Pawinskivirus
- Paysduvirus
- Pbunavirus
- Peatvirus
- Pebcunavirus
- Pecentumvirus
- Pecluvirus
- Pediavirus
- Pedosvirus
- Peduovirus
- Peeveelvirus
- Pefuambidensovirus
- Pegivirus
- Pegunavirus
- Pehohrivirus
- Pehsaduvirus
- Pekhitvirus
- Pektosvirus
- Pelagivirus
- Pelamoviroid
- Pelarspovirus
- Pelmivirus
- Pemapivirus
- Pemunavirus
- Penicillimonavirus
- Penintadodekavirus
- Penoulivirus
- Penstylhamaparvovirus
- Pepevirus
- Pepusduvirus
- Pepyhexavirus
- Percavirus
- Percyvirus
- Perhabdovirus
- Perisivirus
- Peropuvirus
- Perrunavirus
- Persistencevirus
- Pestivirus
- Peternellavirus
- Petruschkyvirus
- Petsuvirus
- Pettyvirus
- Petuvirus
- Phabiovirus
- Phabquatrovirus
- Phaeovirus
- Phapecoctavirus
- Pharaohvirus
- Phasivirus
- Phayoncevirus
- Phelinovirus
- Phialvirus
- Phietavirus
- Phifelvirus
- Phikmvvirus
- Phikzvirus
- Philippevirus
- Philtcovirus
- Phimunavirus
- Phipapillomavirus
- Phistoryvirus
- Phitrevirus
- Phlebovirus
- Phleivirus
- Phobosvirus
- Phobpsivirus
- Phrappuccinovirus
- Phulihavirus
- Phulivirus
- Phutvirus
- Phyllomonavirus
- Phytoreovirus
- Picardvirus
- Pidchovirus
- Piedvirus
- Pienvirus
- Pifdecavirus
- Pihngevirus
- Pijolavirus
- Pikminvirus
- Pinnievirus
- Piorkowskivirus
- Pipapillomavirus
- Pipefishvirus
- Pipoluvirus
- Piponevirus
- Pippivirus
- Pipunevirus
- Pirifovirus
- Piscesmortuivirus
- Piscichuvirus
- Piscihepevirus
- Pitorquevirus
- Plaisancevirus
- Plasmavirus
- Plasmopamonavirus
- Plateaulakevirus
- Platypuvirus
- Playavirus
- Plazymidvirus
- Pleakleyvirus
- Plectrovirus
- Pleeduovirus
- Pleetrevirus
- Pletoitzamnavirus
- Plotvirus
- Plymouthvirus
- Poacevirus
- Podivirus
- Podtsbuvirus
- Poecivirus
- Pogseptimavirus
- Pohlevirus
- Pohlodivirus
- Pohlydovirus
- Pohtamavirus
- Poindextervirus
- Pokkenvirus
- Pokrovskaiavirus
- Polemovirus
- Polerovirus
- Pollockvirus
- Pollyceevirus
- Polybotosvirus
- Polymycovirus
- Pomeroyivirus
- Pomovirus
- Poncivirus
- Ponsvirus
- Pontunivirus
- Pontusvirus
- Popoffvirus
- Pormufvirus
- Porprismacovirus
- Porrectionivirus
- Poseidonvirus
- Pospiviroid
- Potamipivirus
- Potamoivirus
- Potexvirus
- Potyvirus
- Pourcelvirus
- Poushouvirus
- Powerballvirus
- Powvirus
- Pradovirus
- Prasinovirus
- Predatorvirus
- Pregotovirus
- Presleyvirus
- Primolicivirus
- Priunavirus
- Privateervirus
- Proboscivirus
- Prosimiispumavirus
- Protoambidensovirus
- Protobacilladnavirus
- Protoparvovirus
- Prunevirus
- Prymnesiovirus
- Przondovirus
- Psavirus
- Psecadovirus
- Psehatovirus
- Pseudotevenvirus
- Pseudovirus
- Psiaduvirus
- Psimevirus
- Psimunavirus
- Psipapillomavirus
- Psitorquevirus
- Psoetuvirus
- Psouhdivirus
- Pteridovirus
- Pteropopoxvirus
- Pterovirus
- Puahadnavirus
- Pudlivirus
- Puduphavirus
- Puhrivirus
- Puirovirus
- Pujohnavirus
- Pukovnikvirus
- Pulverervirus
- Punavirus
- Puppervirus
- Purivirus
- Purkyvirus
- Pushchinovirus
- Pygoscepivirus
- Pylasvirus

== Q ==
- Qadamvirus
- Qeihnovirus
- Qingdaovirus
- Quadragintavirus
- Quadrivirus
- Quaranjavirus
- Qubevirus
- Quesadillavirus
- Questintvirus
- Quhwahvirus
- Quivirus
- Quwivirus

== R ==
- Rabovirus
- Radbaivirus
- Radostvirus
- Rafivirus
- Rahariannevirus
- Rainacovirus
- Rajidapivirus
- Raleighvirus
- Ranavirus
- Raphidovirus
- Rauchvirus
- Raunefjordenvirus
- Ravarandavirus
- Ravavirus
- Ravinvirus
- Recovirus
- Redjacvirus
- Refugevirus
- Reginaelenavirus
- Rehihmevirus
- Rehudzovirus
- Reipivirus
- Replylivirus
- Reptarenavirus
- Reptillovirus
- Rerduovirus
- Respirovirus
- Restivirus
- Retbasiphovirus
- Reyvirus
- Rhadinovirus
- Rheavirus
- Rhizidiovirus
- Rhizomonavirus
- Rhizoulivirus
- Rhodobactegtaviriform
- Rhodovulugtaviriform
- Rhohmbavirus
- Rhopapillomavirus
- Rhotorquevirus
- Richievirus
- Rigallicvirus
- Rimavirus
- Ringilvirus
- Ripduovirus
- Risingsunvirus
- Risjevirus
- Rivapovirus
- Riverridervirus
- Rivsvirus
- Robigovirus
- Rocahepevirus
- Rochuvirus
- Rockefellervirus
- Rockvillevirus
- Rodtovirus
- Rogerhendrixvirus
- Rogunavirus
- Rohelivirus
- Rohsdrivirus
- Rollinsvirus
- Ronaldovirus
- Ronavirus
- Ronodorvirus
- Rosadnavirus
- Rosariovirus
- Rosavirus
- Rosebushvirus
- Rosemountvirus
- Rosenblumvirus
- Roseolovirus
- Roskildevirus
- Roslyckyvirus
- Rotavirus
- Roufvirus
- Rowavirus
- Roymovirus
- Rtpvirus
- Rubivirus
- Rubodvirus
- Ruegerigtaviriform
- Ruflodivirus
- Rusvolovirus
- Ruthyvirus
- Rymovirus
- Ryyoungvirus

== S ==
- Sabavirus
- Sabourvirus
- Saclayvirus
- Sadwavirus
- Saetivirus
- Sagamiharavirus
- Saguarovirus
- Saikungvirus
- Saintgironsvirus
- Sajorinivirus
- Sakobuvirus
- Salacisavirus
- Salasvirus
- Salchichonvirus
- Saldibavirus
- Salemvirus
- Salinovirus
- Salisharnavirus
- Salivirus
- Salmondvirus
- Salmonpoxvirus
- Salmovirus
- Salovirus
- Salterprovirus
- Saltrevirus
- Salutenavirus
- Salvavirus
- Salvovirus
- Samistivirus
- Samsavirus
- Samunavirus
- Samuneavirus
- Samwavirus
- Sandeparvovirus
- Sandinevirus
- Sanguivirus
- Sanovirus
- Sansavirus
- Sanstrivirus
- Santafevirus
- Sanyabayvirus
- Sapelovirus
- Saphexavirus
- Sapovirus
- Sardinovirus
- Sargevirus
- Sarumanvirus
- Sasdunavirus
- Sashavirus
- Sasquatchvirus
- Sasvirus
- Sauletekiovirus
- Saundersvirus
- Sawaravirus
- Sawastrivirus
- Sawgrhavirus
- Scappvirus
- Scapunavirus
- Scarabeuvirus
- Schiekvirus
- Schizotequatrovirus
- Schmidtvirus
- Schmidvirus
- Schmittlotzvirus
- Schnabeltiervirus
- Schubertvirus
- Scindoambidensovirus
- Sciuripoxvirus
- Sciuriunavirus
- Sclerodarnavirus
- Sclerotimonavirus
- Scleroulivirus
- Scloravirus
- Scoliodonvirus
- Scophrhavirus
- Scottvirus
- Scuadavirus
- Sculuvirus
- Scutavirus
- Scuticavirus
- Scyllavirus
- Sdenfavirus
- Sdonativirus
- Sdribtuvirus
- Seadornavirus
- Seahorsevirus
- Seamegvirus
- Seawadnavirus
- Secretariatvirus
- Sectovirus
- Sednavirus
- Sedonavirus
- Seejivirus
- Segzyvirus
- Sehcovirus
- Sehpovirus
- Semodevirus
- Semotivirus
- Sendosyvirus
- Senecavirus
- Senitvirus
- Senquatrovirus
- Sentinelvirus
- Seodaemunguvirus
- Seongbukvirus
- Seongnamvirus
- Seoulvirus
- Septimatrevirus
- Septovirus
- Sepunavirus
- Sequivirus
- Serangoonvirus
- Serkorvirus
- Sertoctavirus
- Sertovirus
- Serwervirus
- Sessunavirus
- Setohruvirus
- Seunavirus
- Seuratvirus
- Seussvirus
- Sexopuavirus
- Sextaecvirus
- Seybrovirus
- Sfunavirus
- Shalavirus
- Shamshuipovirus
- Shanbavirus
- Shandongvirus
- Shandvirus
- Shangavirus
- Shantouvirus
- Shapirovirus
- Sharonstreetvirus
- Shaspivirus
- Shebanavirus
- Sheenvirus
- Shenzhenivirus
- Shenzhenvirus
- Sherbrookevirus
- Shihmovirus
- Shihovirus
- Shihwivirus
- Shilevirus
- Shirahamavirus
- Shizishanvirus
- Sholavirus
- Shomudavirus
- Shopitevirus
- Shoyavirus
- Shuimuvirus
- Shuravirus
- Siadenovirus
- Siaravirus
- Siatvirus
- Sicinivirus
- Sicregavirus
- Sidiousvirus
- Sidiruavirus
- Sieqvirus
- Siftrevirus
- Sigmapapillomavirus
- Sigmatorquevirus
- Sigmavirus
- Silentrexvirus
- Silviavirus
- Simiispumavirus
- Siminovitchvirus
- Simismacovirus
- Simpcentumvirus
- Simplexvirus
- Sinaivirus
- Sincthavirus
- Siniperhavirus
- Sinsheimervirus
- Siophivirus
- Siovirus
- Siphunculivirus
- Sirevirus
- Sixamavirus
- Skarprettervirus
- Skatevirus
- Skhembuvirus
- Skogvirus
- Skrubnovirus
- Skulduggeryvirus
- Skunavirus
- Skysandvirus
- Slashvirus
- Sleepyheadvirus
- Slepowronvirus
- Slopekvirus
- Smoothievirus
- Smudhfivirus
- Snuvirus
- Snuwdevirus
- Sobemovirus
- Socyvirus
- Soetuvirus
- Sogarnavirus
- Sokavirus
- Solendovirus
- Somasatellite
- Sonalivirus
- Sophoyesatellite
- Sophritavirus
- Sopolycivirus
- Sortsnevirus
- Soupsvirus
- Sourvirus
- Soymovirus
- Sozzivirus
- Sparkyvirus
- Spbetavirus
- Sperdavirus
- Sphonivirus
- Spiromicrovirus
- Spizizenvirus
- Sprivivirus
- Sputnikvirus
- Squashvirus
- Squirtyvirus
- Sripuvirus
- Staminivirus
- Stanholtvirus
- Stehlmavirus
- Stehnavirus
- Steinhofvirus
- Stockinghallvirus
- Stompelvirus
- Stompvirus
- Stonewallvirus
- Stoningtonvirus
- Stopalavirus
- Stopavirus
- Stormageddonvirus
- Stralarivirus
- Striavirus
- Striwavirus
- Stubburvirus
- Stupavirus
- Stupnyavirus
- Stylovirus
- Subclovsatellite
- Subteminivirus
- Sugarlandvirus
- Suhnsivirus
- Suipoxvirus
- Sukhumvitvirus
- Sukkupivirus
- Sukuvirus
- Sunrhavirus
- Sunshinevirus
- Supelovirus
- Surghavirus
- Suseptimavirus
- Susfortunavirus
- Suspvirus
- Sustrivirus
- Suturavirus
- Suwonvirus
- Svunavirus
- Sweetvirus
- Swiduovirus
- Swihdzovirus
- Symapivirus
- Synelinevirus
- Synodonvirus
- Syrbvirus

== T ==
- Tabernariusvirus
- Taceavirus
- Tahluvirus
- Taipeivirus
- Takahashivirus
- Tamanovirus
- Tamkungvirus
- Tandoganvirus
- Tangaroavirus
- Tanisvirus
- Tankvirus
- Tantvirus
- Tanzavirus
- Tapikevirus
- Tapjovirus
- Tapwovirus
- Taranisvirus
- Taupapillomavirus
- Tawavirus
- Teciucevirus
- Tedavirus
- Teetrevirus
- Tefnutvirus
- Tegunavirus
- Tehdravirus
- Tehmuvirus
- Tehnexuvirus
- Tehnicivirus
- Tehuhdavirus
- Telnavirus
- Temfrudevirus
- Tenuivirus
- Tepovirus
- Tepukevirus
- Tequatrovirus
- Tequintavirus
- Terapinvirus
- Tertilicivirus
- Teschovirus
- Teseptimavirus
- Testadenovirus
- Tethysvirus
- Tetipavirus
- Tetraparvovirus
- Tettorquevirus
- Tetuambidensovirus
- Teubervirus
- Thalassavirus
- Thamnovirus
- Thaumasvirus
- Thehlovirus
- Theiavirus
- Thetaarterivirus
- Thetabobvirus
- Thetahypovirus
- Thetapapillomavirus
- Thetapolyomavirus
- Thetatorquevirus
- Thetisvirus
- Thidevirus
- Thiuhmevirus
- Thiwvovirus
- Thiyevirus
- Thobivirus
- Thogotovirus
- Thomixvirus
- Thonkovirus
- Thornevirus
- Thottimvirus
- Thriprhavirus
- Thurisazvirus
- Thyrsuvirus
- Tiamatvirus
- Tibirnivirus
- Tibrovirus
- Ticahravirus
- Tidunavirus
- Tieomvirus
- Tigrvirus
- Tigunavirus
- Tiilvirus
- Tijeunavirus
- Tikiyavirus
- Tilapinevirus
- Timirovirus
- Timquatrovirus
- Timshelvirus
- Tinalinvirus
- Tinduovirus
- Tinebovirus
- Tinytimothyvirus
- Titanvirus
- Tlsvirus
- Tobamovirus
- Tobravirus
- Tocinivirus
- Tofonivirus
- Tohkunevirus
- Tohvovirus
- Tomasvirus
- Tombusvirus
- Tonitrusvirus
- Topilevirus
- Topocuvirus
- Torbevirus
- Torchivirus
- Torovirus
- Torradovirus
- Tortellinivirus
- Totivirus
- Tottorivirus
- Toursvirus
- Toutatisvirus
- Tralespevirus
- Traversvirus
- Tredecimvirus
- Treisdeltapapillomavirus
- Treisepsilonpapillomavirus
- Treisetapapillomavirus
- Treisiotapapillomavirus
- Treiskappapapillomavirus
- Treisthetapapillomavirus
- Treiszetapapillomavirus
- Tremovirus
- Tresduoquattuorvirus
- Triamitovirus
- Triatovirus
- Triavirus
- Trichomonasvirus
- Trichovirus
- Triduovirus
- Trigintaduovirus
- Trinavirus
- Trinevirus
- Trinifflemingvirus
- Triniovirus
- Triplejayvirus
- Tritimovirus
- Tritonvirus
- Troedvirus
- Tropivirus
- Trucevirus
- Trungvirus
- Tsamsavirus
- Tsarbombavirus
- Tsecebavirus
- Tsuhreavirus
- Tsukubavirus
- Tulanevirus
- Tunavirus
- Tunggulvirus
- Tungrovirus
- Tuodvirus
- Tupanvirus
- Tupavirus
- Turbidovirus
- Turncurtovirus
- Turrinivirus
- Tuskovirus
- Tuwendivirus
- Twortvirus
- Tybeckvirus
- Tymovirus
- Typhavirus
- Tyrahlevirus

== U ==
- Uetakevirus
- Ulegvirus
- Uliginvirus
- Umbravirus
- Unahavirus
- Unaquatrovirus
- Unicornvirus
- Unuamitovirus
- Unyawovirus
- Upsilonpapillomavirus
- Upsilontorquevirus
- Ureyisuvirus
- Usarudivirus
- Ushumevirus
- Usmuvirus
- Uukuvirus
- Uwajimavirus

== V ==
- Vaccinivirus
- Valbvirus
- Valinorvirus
- Valovirus
- Vansinderenvirus
- Vapochuvirus
- Vapseptimavirus
- Varicellovirus
- Varicosavirus
- Varunavirus
- Vashvirus
- Vasivirus
- Vebetovirus
- Vectrevirus
- Vedamuthuvirus
- Veewebvirus
- Vegasvirus
- Velarivirus
- Vellamovirus
- Vendavirus
- Vendettavirus
- Vequintavirus
- Veracruzvirus
- Veravirus
- Vernevirus
- Versovirus
- Vesehyavirus
- Vesiculovirus
- Vesivirus
- Vespertilionpoxvirus
- Vespertiliovirus
- Veterinaerplatzvirus
- Vhmlvirus
- Vhulanivirus
- Vibakivirus
- Vicialiavirus
- Vicoquintavirus
- Vicosavirus
- Victorivirus
- Vidquintavirus
- Vieuvirus
- Villovirus
- Vilniusvirus
- Vimunumvirus
- Vindevirus
- Vinehtivirus
- Vingilotevirus
- Vipetofemvirus
- Vipivirus
- Vipunavirus
- Virgulavirus
- Virtovirus
- Vitivirus
- Vividuovirus
- Voetvirus
- Vohsuavirus
- Vojvodinavirus
- Votkovvirus
- Voulevirus
- Vulnificusvirus

== W ==
- Wadgaonvirus
- Waedenswilvirus
- Waewaevirus
- Wahbolevirus
- Wahdswovirus
- Wahtavirus
- Waikavirus
- Wakandavirus
- Wamavirus
- Wanchaivirus
- Wanderervirus
- Wanjuvirus
- Warsawvirus
- Warwickvirus
- Watanabevirus
- Waukeshavirus
- Wawtorquevirus
- Wbetavirus
- Weaselvirus
- Webervirus
- Wecineivirus
- Weheuvirus
- Wellingtonvirus
- Wenrivirus
- Whackvirus
- Whietlevirus
- Whiflysatellite
- Whilavirus
- Whispovirus
- Whiteheadvirus
- Whodehavirus
- Whopevirus
- Widsokivirus
- Wifcevirus
- Wildcatvirus
- Wilnyevirus
- Wilsonroadvirus
- Winklervirus
- Winunavirus
- Wishivirus
- Wizardvirus
- Woesvirus
- Wohudhevirus
- Wollypogvirus
- Wolominvirus
- Wongtaivirus
- Woodruffvirus
- Wotdevirus
- Wphvirus
- Wroclawvirus
- Wuhanvirus
- Wuhivirus
- Wulfhauvirus
- Wulosvivirus
- Wumivirus
- Wumpquatrovirus
- Wumptrevirus
- Wyahnevirus

== X ==
- Xaviavirus
- Xenophyvirus
- Xiamenvirus
- Xinspivirus
- Xipapillomavirus
- Xipdecavirus
- Xitorquevirus
- Xooduovirus
- Xoxocotlavirus
- Xuanwuvirus
- Xuquatrovirus
- Xylavirus
- Xylivirus

== Y ==
- Yahnavirus
- Yanchengvirus
- Yangvirus
- Yaravirus
- Yasminevirus
- Yatapoxvirus
- Yautsimvirus
- Yeceytrevirus
- Yekorevirus
- Yellowseavirus
- Yemegivirus
- Yenihzavirus
- Yermavirus
- Yeshinuvirus
- Yeziwivirus
- Yihwangvirus
- Yingchengvirus
- Yingvirus
- Yohcadevirus
- Yokohamavirus
- Yoloswagvirus
- Yonginvirus
- Yongloolinvirus
- Yongunavirus
- Yonseivirus
- Yosifvirus
- Youngvirus
- Yuavirus
- Yuhrihovirus
- Yulgyerivirus
- Yumkaaxvirus
- Yushanluvirus
- Yushanvirus
- Yuyuevirus
- Yvonnevirus

== Z ==
- Zarhavirus
- Zayintorquevirus
- Zeavirus
- Zedzedvirus
- Zetaarterivirus
- Zetahypovirus
- Zetapapillomavirus
- Zetapolyomavirus
- Zetatorquevirus
- Zetavirus
- Zhangjivirus
- Zhangqianvirus
- Zhonglingvirus
- Zhoulongquanvirus
- Zicotriavirus
- Zindervirus
- Zitchvirus
- Zukovirus
- Zurivirus
- Zuysuivirus
- Zybavirus

== Subgenera ==
- Acarallexivirus
- Acimevirus
- Amalacovirus
- Ampobartevirus
- Andecovirus
- Aplyccavirus
- Balbicanovirus
- Bantovirus
- Behecravirus
- Beturrivirus
- Blicbavirus
- Bosnitovirus
- Brangacovirus
- Buldecovirus
- Casualivirus
- Cegacovirus
- Chabetovirus
- Chalatovirus
- Chibartevirus
- Cholivirus
- Colacovirus
- Cradenivirus
- Debiartevirus
- Decacovirus
- Dumedivirus
- Duvinacovirus
- Embecovirus
- Enselivirus
- Eurpobartevirus
- Fomevirus
- Hanalivirus
- Hedartevirus
- Hepoptovirus
- Herdecovirus
- Hibecovirus
- Igacovirus
- Insemevirus
- Kadilivirus
- Kaftartevirus
- Karsalivirus
- Kigiartevirus
- Luchacovirus
- Mandarivirus
- Marovirus
- Menolivirus
- Merbecovirus
- Mibartevirus
- Milecovirus
- Minacovirus
- Minunacovirus
- Mitartevirus
- Myotacovirus
- Namcalivirus
- Nobecovirus
- Nyctacovirus
- Ofalivirus
- Pedacovirus
- Peiartevirus
- Pimfabavirus
- Rebatovirus
- Renitovirus
- Rhinacovirus
- Roypretovirus
- Salnivirus
- Samovirus
- Sanematovirus
- Sarbecovirus
- Satsumavirus
- Sekatovirus
- Selatovirus
- Serecovirus
- Setracovirus
- Sheartevirus
- Snaturtovirus
- Soracovirus
- Stramovirus
- Sunacovirus
- Tegacovirus
- Tilitovirus
- Tipravirus
- Trisihevirus
- Wenilivirus
- Xintolivirus
- Yilivirus

== See also ==
- List of virus families and subfamilies
- List of virus taxa
- Table of clinically important viruses
- Virology
- Virus
- Virus classification
- Wikipedia:WikiProject Viruses
- WikiSpecies:Virus
