= Podoviridae =

- Typical structure of a podovirus

Virus classification
- (unranked): Virus
- Realm: Duplodnaviria
- Kingdom: Heunggongvirae
- Phylum: Uroviricota
- Class: Caudoviricetes
- Order: Caudovirales (abolished 2021)
- Family: Podoviridae

Subfamilies and genera
- see text

Family of viruses

Podoviridae was a family of bacteriophage in the order Caudovirales often associated with T-7 like phages. The family and order Caudovirales have now been abolished, with the term podovirus now used to refer to the morphology of viruses in this former family. There were 130 species in this family, assigned to 3 subfamilies and 52 genera. This family was characterized by having very short, noncontractile tails. Many former phages in the former family Podoviriade are now classified in the Autographiviridae

== Structure ==
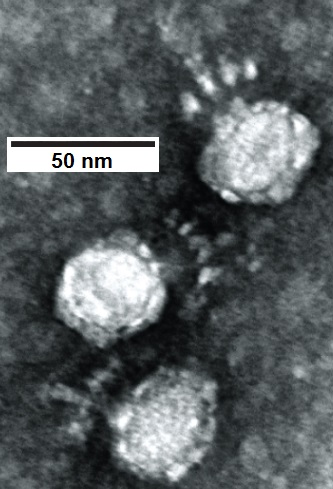
Electron micrograph of podovirus ΦCP7R of Clostridium perfringens.

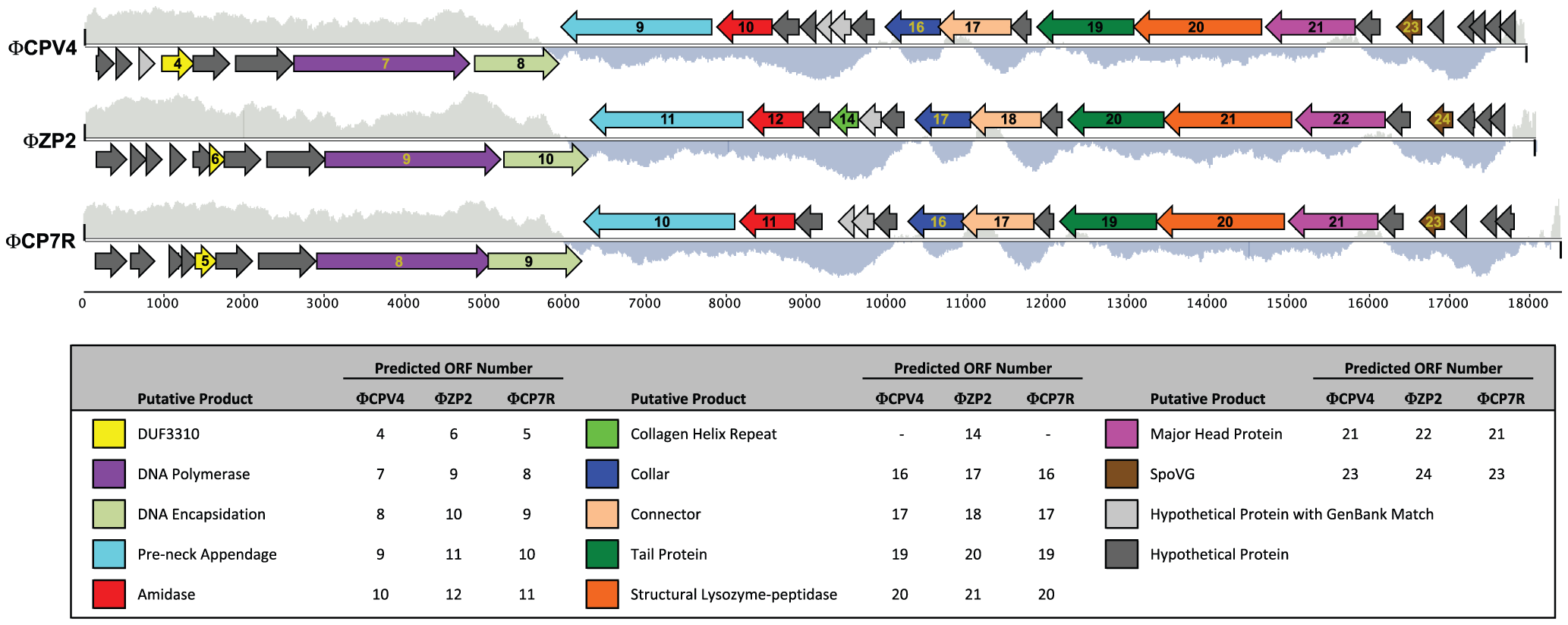
Genomes of some podoviruses of Clostridium perfringens

Viruses in the former family Podoviridae are non-enveloped, with icosahedral and head-tail geometries. The diameter is around 60 nm, and consists of 72 capsomers. The head protein has a molecular mass of ~38 kilodaltons and is present in 460 copies per virion. There are 9 structural proteins. The tail is non-contractile and has 6 short subterminal fibers. It is thick and rod-shaped and built of stacked disks. The maximum length is ~17 nm.

The double stranded DNA genome is linear, around 40-42kb in length, and encodes ~55 genes. The guanine + cytosine content is ~50%. It has terminally redundant sequences and is nonpermuted. By weight, the genome constitutes ~50% of the viron. The genome encodes 9 structural proteins, an adenylated transferase B type DNA polymerase and an RNA polymerase. Three internal proteins constitute the polymerase complex. Two classes of genes are recognized (early and late). This classification is based on the timing of transcription that is temporally regulated. Genes with related functions are clustered together. Genome replication is bidirectional.

== Life cycle ==
Viral replication is cytoplasmic. Entry into the host cell is achieved by adsorption into the host cell. Replication follows the DNA strand displacement model. DNA-templated transcription is the method of transcription. The virus exits the host cell by lysis, and holin/endolysin/spanin proteins. Bacteria serve as the natural host. Transmission routes are passive diffusion. Phage infection is considered self-dosing thus self-limiting. After host lysis, new phages trigger a new infection cycle with surrounding bioavailable host species resulting in growth and expansion.

== Taxonomy ==
Genera within this family have ~40% identity between corresponding proteins. Subfamilies have ~20% identity between corresponding proteins.

The following subfamilies and their genera are recognized (-virinae denotes subfamily and -virus denotes genus):

- Beephvirinae
  - Flowerpowervirus
  - Immanueltrevirus
  - Manuelvirus
- Eekayvirinae
  - Akonivirus
  - Tinytimothyvirus
- Sepvirinae
  - Diegovirus
  - Oslovirus
  - Traversvirus

The following genera are not assigned to a subfamily:

- Anjalivirus
- Astrithrvirus
- Badaztecvirus
- Bjornvirus
- Bruynoghevirus
- Burrovirus
- Chopinvirus
- Cimandefvirus
- Delislevirus
- Dybvigvirus
- Enhodamvirus
- Enquatrovirus
- Fipvunavirus
- Firingavirus
- Gervaisevirus
- Giessenvirus
- Hollowayvirus
- Jasminevirus
- Kafunavirus
- Kelquatrovirus
- Kochitakasuvirus
- Kozyakovvirus
- Krylovvirus
- Kuravirus
- Lahexavirus
- Lastavirus
- Lederbergvirus
- Lessievirus
- Lightbulbvirus
- Myxoctovirus
- Pagevirus
- Parlovirus
- Perisivirus
- Privateervirus
- Rauchvirus
- Ryyoungvirus
- Schmidvirus
- Sendosyvirus
- Skarprettervirus
- Sortsnevirus
- Uetakevirus
- Vicosavirus
- Wumpquatrovirus
- Wumptrevirus
- Xuquatrovirus

Lastly, the species Pseudomonas virus 119X is unassigned to a genus or subfamily.
