= Listeria virus A511 =

Virus classification
- (unranked): Virus
- Realm: Duplodnaviria
- Kingdom: Heunggongvirae
- Phylum: Uroviricota
- Class: Caudoviricetes
- Family: Herelleviridae
- Genus: Pecentumvirus
- Species: Listeria virus A511

Species of virus

Listeria virus A511 is a virus of the family Herelleviridae, genus Pecentumvirus.

As a member of group I of the Baltimore classification, Listeria virus A511 is a dsDNA virus. All the family Herelleviridae members share a nonenveloped morphology consisting of a head and a tail separated by a neck. Its genome is linear. The propagation of the virions includes attaching to a host cell (a bacterium, as Listeria virus A511 is a bacteriophage), and the injection of the double-stranded DNA; the host transcribes and translates it to manufacture new particles. Replicating the viruses genetic content requires host cell DNA polymerases, and hence, the process is highly dependent on the cell cycle.

Its genome contains 134,494 base pairs coding 190 putative open reading frames (ORFs) and 16 tRNA genes.
