= BXZ =

BXZ can refer to:

- Binahari language, spoken in Papua New Guinea
- Bakhshapur railway station, a train station in Kashmore District, Sindh province, Pakistan
- Bunsil Airport, an airport in Bunsil, Papua New Guinea; see List of airports by IATA airport code: B

== See also ==
- Mycobacterium virus Bxz1, a bacteria-infecting virus species from the Bixzunavirus genus
- Mycobacterium virus Bxz2, a bacteria-infecting virus species from the Fromanvirus genus
