= Staphylococcus virus G1 =

Virus classification
- (unranked): Virus
- Realm: Duplodnaviria
- Kingdom: Heunggongvirae
- Phylum: Uroviricota
- Class: Caudoviricetes
- Family: Herelleviridae
- Genus: Kayvirus
- Species: Kayvirus G1

Species of virus

Bacteriophage phi812 which exhibits a high degree of similarity to bacteriophage G1. The structure of bacteriophage Phi812 at atomic resolution is presented here. From left to right: The Chimera software structure is depicted, the Maestro software electrostatics structure is depicted, and the ChimeraX software hydrophilicity structure is depicted in orange-green.

Staphylococcus virus G1 is a virus of the family Herelleviridae, genus Kayvirus.

As a member of the group I of the Baltimore classification, Staphylococcus virus G1 is a dsDNA virus. All the family Herelleviridae members share a nonenveloped morphology consisting of a head and a tail separated by a neck. Its genome is linear. The propagation of the virions includes the attaching to a host cell (a bacterium, as Staphylococcus virus G1 is a bacteriophage) and the injection of the double stranded DNA; the host transcribes and translates it to manufacture new particles. To replicate its genetic content requires host cell DNA polymerases and, hence, the process is highly dependent on the cell cycle.

The Gp67 protein of G1 has been found to interact with its host's RNA polymerase though an interaction with a sigma factor.

The phage contains a genome of 138,715 base pairs with a 30.4% of GC content and 214 predicted genes; this means that the 88.5% of the DNA is coding open reading frames, and therefore the gene density (the number of genes per kilobase) is 1.54.
