= Alphatetraviridae =

Virus classification
- (unranked): Virus
- Realm: Riboviria
- Kingdom: Orthornavirae
- Phylum: Kitrinoviricota
- Class: Alsuviricetes
- Order: Hepelivirales
- Family: Alphatetraviridae

Genera
- Betatetravirus; Omegatetravirus

Family of viruses

Alphatetraviridae is a family of viruses. Moths and butterflies serve as natural hosts. There are two genera in the family. Infection outcome varies from unapparent to lethal. It was created by splitting Tetraviridae.

== Taxonomy ==
The following genera are assigned to the family:

- Betatetravirus
- Omegatetravirus

== Structure ==
Viruses in Alphatetraviridae are non-enveloped, with icosahedral geometries, and T=4 symmetry. The diameter is around 40 nm. Genomes are linear and non-segmented, bipartite, around 6.5kb in length.

Genus	Structure	Symmetry	Capsid	Genomic arrangement	Genomic segmentation
Betatetravirus	Icosahedral	T=4	Non-enveloped	Linear	Monopartite
Omegatetravirus	Icosahedral	T=4	Non-enveloped	Linear	Segmented

== Life cycle ==
Viral replication is cytoplasmic. Entry into the host cell is achieved by penetration into the host cell. Replication follows the positive stranded RNA virus replication model. Positive stranded rna virus transcription is the method of transcription. Translation takes place by leaky scanning, and ribosomal skipping. Moths and butterflies serve as the natural host. Transmission routes are oral.

Genus	Host details	Tissue tropism	Entry details	Release details	Replication site	Assembly site	Transmission
Betatetravirus	Moths; butterflies	Midgut	Cell receptor endocytosis	Budding	Cytoplasm	Cytoplasm	Oral
Omegatetravirus	Moths; butterflies	Midgut	Cell receptor endocytosis	Budding	Cytoplasm	Cytoplasm	Oral
