= Rosenblumvirus =

Virus classification
- (unranked): Virus
- Realm: Duplodnaviria
- Kingdom: Heunggongvirae
- Phylum: Uroviricota
- Class: Caudoviricetes
- Order: Caudovirales (abolished 2021)
- Family: Rountreeviridae
- Subfamily: Rakietenvirinae
- Genus: Rosenblumvirus

Genus of viruses

Rosenblumvirus (synonyms: AHJD-like viruses, Ahjdlikevirus) is a genus of viruses in the order Caudovirales, in the family Rountreeviridae (formerly in Podoviridae), in the subfamily Rakietenvirinae (formerly Picovirinae). Gram positive bacteria serve as natural hosts, with transmission achieved through passive diffusion. There are 12 species in this genus.

== Taxonomy ==
The following species are recognized:

- Staphylococcus virus 66
- Staphylococcus virus 44AHJD
- Staphylococcus virus BP39
- Staphylococcus virus CSA13
- Staphylococcus virus GRCS
- Staphylococcus virus Pabna
- Staphylococcus virus phiAGO13
- Staphylococcus virus PSa3
- Staphylococcus virus S24-1
- Staphylococcus virus SAP2
- Staphylococcus virus SCH1
- Staphylococcus virus SLPW

== Structure ==
Rosenblumviruses are nonenveloped, with a head and tail. The head has icosahedral symmetry (T=4) approximately 54 nm in diameter. The tail is non-contractile and has a collar with twelve appendages. The diameter is around 55 nm, with a length of 27 nm. Genomes are linear, around 20kb in length.

Genus	Structure	Symmetry	Capsid	Genomic arrangement	Genomic segmentation
Rosenblumvirus	Head-Tail	T=4	Non-enveloped	Linear	Monopartite

== Genome ==
Some viruses' genomes have been fully sequenced and are available on NCBI's website. They range between 16k and 17k nucleotides, with 20 to 21 proteins. Complete genomes, as well as additional "unclassified" virus genomes, are available here

== Life cycle ==
The virus attaches to the host cell adhesion receptors using its tail fibers, and ejects the viral DNA into the host periplasm. Viral replication is cytoplasmic. DNA-templated transcription is the method of transcription. Once the viral DNA has been replicated, the procapsid is assembled and packed, and the tail is assembled. Finally, the mature virions are released via lysis.

Genus	Host details	Tissue tropism	Entry details	Release details	Replication site	Assembly site	Transmission
Rosenblumvirus	Bacteria: gram positive	None	Injection	Lysis	Cytoplasm	Cytoplasm	Passive diffusion

== History ==
According to ICTV's ninth report in 2009, the genus Ahjdlikevirus was first accepted under the name AHJD-like viruses. In 2012, the genus was renamed to Ahjdlikevirus. The genus was later renamed to Rosenblumvirus.
