= Tetraviridae =

Extinct family of viruses

Tetraviridae is a family of viruses named due to its members having T=4 symmetry and infecting butterflies and moths. The family was dissolved in 2011 due to genetic differences and replaced with three families, each of which still contain the name tetraviridae:

- Alphatetraviridae
- Carmotetraviridae
- Permutotetraviridae

The grouping known as Tetraviridae is supported by a phylogeny of capsid proteins, but not by the newer 2010s approach of using a phylogeny of RNA-dependent RNA polymerases (RdRp).
