= Zindervirus =

Virus classification
- (unranked): Virus
- Realm: Duplodnaviria
- Kingdom: Heunggongvirae
- Phylum: Uroviricota
- Class: Caudoviricetes
- Order: Autographivirales
- Subfamily: Molineuxvirinae
- Genus: Zindervirus

Genus of viruses

Zindervirus (synonym SP6-like viruses, Sp6likevirus) is a genus of viruses in the family Autographiviridae, within the subfamily Molineuxvirinae. Bacteria serve as the natural host, with transmission achieved through passive diffusion. There are currently three species in this genus, including the type species Salmonella virus SP6.

== Taxonomy ==
The following species are recognized:

- Escherichia virus UAB78
- Salmonella virus BP12B
- Salmonella virus SP6

== Structure ==
Zinderviruses are non-enveloped, with a head and tail. The head is approximately 60 to 65 nm in diameter. The tail is non-contractile and has six prominent spikes.

Genus	Structure	Symmetry	Capsid	Genomic arrangement	Genomic segmentation
Zindervirus	Head-Tail	T=7	Non-enveloped	Linear	Monopartite

== Genome ==
Four of the five viruses' genomes have been fully sequenced and are available on NCBI's website (only Enterobacteria phage K5 is unavailable). They range between 43k and 46k nucleotides, with 52 to 62 proteins. All four complete genomes, as well as several additional "unclassified" virus genomes, are available here

== Life cycle ==
Viral replication is cytoplasmic. The virus attaches to the host cell using its tail fibers, and ejects the viral DNA into the host periplasm. Once the viral genes have been replicated, new virions are assembled in the cell cytoplasm. Mature virions are released via lysis. Transmission route is passive diffusion.

Genus	Host details	Tissue tropism	Entry details	Release details	Replication site	Assembly site	Transmission
Zindervirus	Bacteria	None	Injection	Lysis	Cytoplasm	Cytoplasm	Passive diffusion

== History ==
According to ICTV's 2009 report, the genus SP6likevirus was first accepted under the name SP6-like viruses in the family Podoviridae, sub-family Autographivirinae. The genus name was changed to Sp6likevirus in 2012. It was moved into the subfamily Peduovirinae upon its inception in 2010–11. The following year (2012), the genus was renamed to P2likevirus. These reports are available through ICTV here: 2009, 2012. The genus was later renamed to Zindervirus in the newly established family Autographiviridae.
