= Spounavirinae =

Virus classification
- (unranked): Virus
- Realm: Duplodnaviria
- Kingdom: Heunggongvirae
- Phylum: Uroviricota
- Class: Caudoviricetes
- Family: Herelleviridae
- Subfamily: Spounavirinae

Genera
- Okubovirus; Siminovitchvirus

Subfamily of viruses

Spounavirinae is a subfamily of viruses in the family Herelleviridae. Bacteria serve as natural hosts. There are currently five species in this subfamily, divided among 2 genera.

== Taxonomy ==
The subfamily has two genera:

- Okubovirus
- Siminovitchvirus

== Structure ==
Viruses in the subfamily Spounavirinae are non-enveloped, with icosahedral and Head-tail geometries, and T=16 symmetry. The diameter is around 84–94 nm, with a length of 140–219 in length, contractile with globular structures at its tip, has six long terminal fibers, six short spikes and a double base platenm. Genomes are circular, around 130–160kb in length. The genome codes for 190 to 230 proteins.

== Life cycle ==
Viral replication is cytoplasmic. Entry into the host cell is achieved by adsorption into the host cell. DNA-templated transcription is the method of transcription. Bacteria serve as the natural host. Transmission routes are passive diffusion.
