= Salmonella virus Epsilon15 =

Bacteriophage Epsilon15

Virus classification
- (unranked): Virus
- Realm: Duplodnaviria
- Kingdom: Heunggongvirae
- Phylum: Uroviricota
- Class: Caudoviricetes
- Genus: Uetakevirus
- Species: Uetakevirus epsilon15

Synonyms
- Salmonella virus Epsilon15

Species of virus

Epsilon 15 (or ε15) is a virus, specifically a bacteriophage, known to infect species of Salmonella bacteria including Salmonella anatum. The virus is a short, tailed phage with a double-stranded DNA genome of 39,671 base pairs and 49 open reading frames.
