= Xooduovirus =

Virus classification
- (unranked): Virus
- Realm: Duplodnaviria
- Kingdom: Heunggongvirae
- Phylum: Uroviricota
- Class: Caudoviricetes
- Family: Mesyanzhinovviridae
- Subfamily: Bradleyvirinae
- Genus: Xooduovirus

Species
- Xooduovirus QDWS359; Xooduovirus Xoosp2

Genus of viruses

Xooduovirus is a genus of double-stranded DNA viruses in the family Mesyanzhinovviridae. It was named for the type species Xanthomonas phage Xoo-sp2, which is now called Xooduovirus Xoosp2. That species is a lytic bacteriophage that affects Xanthomonas oryzae pv. oryzae.
