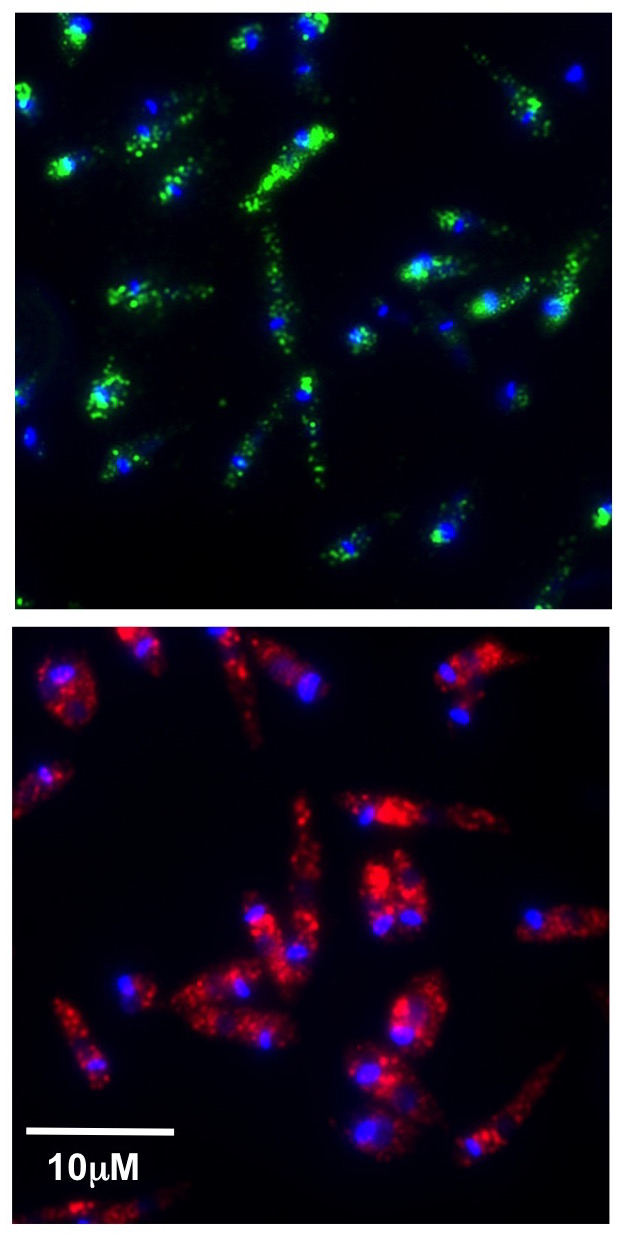
- Leishmaniavirus detected in Leishmania guyanensis parasites by immunofluorescence microscopy Blue: DAPI-stained parasitic DNA; Green: Leishmaniavirus dsRNA; Red: Leishmaniavirus capsid

Virus classification
- (unranked): Virus
- Realm: Riboviria
- Kingdom: Orthornavirae
- Phylum: Duplornaviricota
- Class: Chrymotiviricetes
- Order: Ghabrivirales
- Family: Pseudototiviridae
- Genus: Leishmaniavirus

Species
- See text

= Leishmaniavirus =

Genus of viruses

Leishmaniavirus (also known as Leishmania RNA virus or LRV) is a genus of double-stranded RNA virus, in the family Pseudototiviridae. Protozoa serve as natural hosts, and Leishmaniaviruses are present in several species of the human protozoan parasite Leishmania. There are six species in this genus.

== History ==
The presence of virus-like particles in Leishmania hertigi was first reported in 1974. Various molecular descriptions of Leishmaniavirus were revealed over the subsequent decade, and mostly performed on members of the South American L. (Viannia) subgenus of parasites (which carries the LRV1 species) such as L. guyanensis (L.g) and then later in L. braziliensis (L.b). Recently, interest in these microbial viruses has been renewed by a finding that they may play a role in leishmanial pathology.

== Prevalence ==
The prevalence of LRV1 in human parasites is still largely unknown. So far, no LRV1 has been detected in other key L. (Viannia) species, such as L. panamensis (L.p). Further, LRV1 is rarely found in species outside the Neotropics, and so far, all Paleotropic LRV isolates have shown genetic differences that were sufficient to classify them in a new subcategory named “LRV2”. This variant of LRV was first classified in a single isolate of L. major (L.m), and is recorded as the only and exceptional member of L.m to carry it. Recently, LRV2 has also been found in strains of L. aethiopica (L.ae) isolated from biopsies of cutaneous leishmaniasis patients in the Ethiopian Highlands.

== Taxonomy ==
The following species are assigned to the genus:

- Leishmaniavirus go
- Leishmaniavirus ichi (Leishmania RNA virus 1)
- Leishmaniavirus ni (Leishmania RNA virus 2)
- Leishmaniavirus roku
- Leishmaniavirus sani
- Leishmaniavirus shi

== Structure ==
Viruses in Leishmaniavirus are non-enveloped, with icosahedral geometries, and T=2 symmetry. The diameter is around 33 nm. Genomes are linear, around 5.3kb in length. The genome has 2 large open reading frames.

Genus	Structure	Symmetry	Capsid	Genomic arrangement	Genomic segmentation
Leishmaniavirus	Icosahedral	T=2	Non-enveloped	Linear	Monopartite

== Life cycle ==
Viral replication is cytoplasmic. Replication follows the double-stranded RNA virus replication model. Double-stranded RNA virus transcription is the method of transcription. Translation takes place by +1 ribosomal frameshifting. Protozoa serve as the natural host.

Genus	Host details	Tissue tropism	Entry details	Release details	Replication site	Assembly site	Transmission
Leishmaniavirus	Protozoa: leishmania	None	Cell receptor endocytosis	Cell division	Cytoplasm	Cytoplasm	Cell division
