= Permutotetraviridae =

Virus classification
- (unranked): Virus
- Realm: Riboviria
- Kingdom: Orthornavirae
- Phylum: incertae sedis
- Family: Permutotetraviridae

Genera
- Alphapermutotetravirus

Family of viruses

Permutotetraviridae is a family of viruses. Lepidopteran insects serve as natural hosts. The family contains one genus that has two species. Diseases associated with this family include: infection outcome varies from unapparent to lethal. It was created by splitting Tetraviridae.

== Taxonomy ==
Permutotetraviridae has one genus which contains two species:

- Genus: Alphapermutotetravirus
  - Euprosterna elaeasa virus
  - Thosea asigna virus

== Structure ==
Viruses in Permutotetraviridae are non-enveloped, with icosahedral geometries, and T=4 symmetry. The diameter is around 40 nm. Genomes are linear, around 5.6kb in length.

Genus	Structure	Symmetry	Capsid	Genomic arrangement	Genomic segmentation
Alphapermutotetravirus	Icosahedral	T=4	Non-enveloped	Linear	Monopartite

== Life cycle ==
Viral replication is cytoplasmic. Entry into the host cell is achieved by penetration into the host cell. Replication follows the positive stranded RNA virus replication model. Positive stranded RNA virus transcription is the method of transcription. Lepidopteran insectes serve as the natural host. Transmission routes are oral.

Genus	Host details	Tissue tropism	Entry details	Release details	Replication site	Assembly site	Transmission
Alphapermutotetravirus	Lepidopteran insects	Midgut	Unknown	Unknown	Cytoplasm	Cytoplasm	Oral

== Phylogenetic position ==
A 2020 Yangshan Port metagenomic study found that the Birnaviridae and Permutotetraviridae RdRPs fall into Pisuviricota near the Partitiviridae after correcting for domain permutation. This treatment was supported by the presence of alternative permutations in sampled metagenomes belonging to the same branch.
