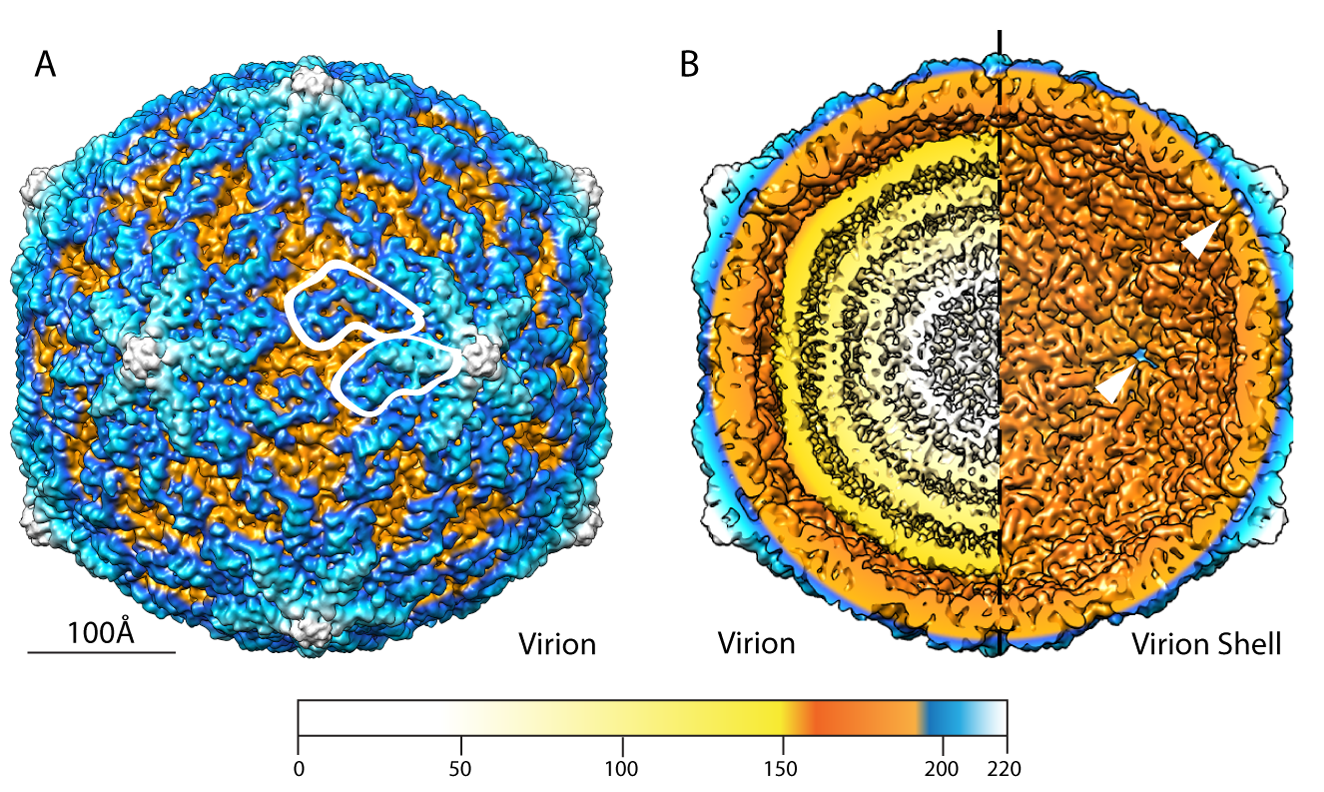
- Capsid structure of Helminthosporium victoriae virus 190S (HvV190S)
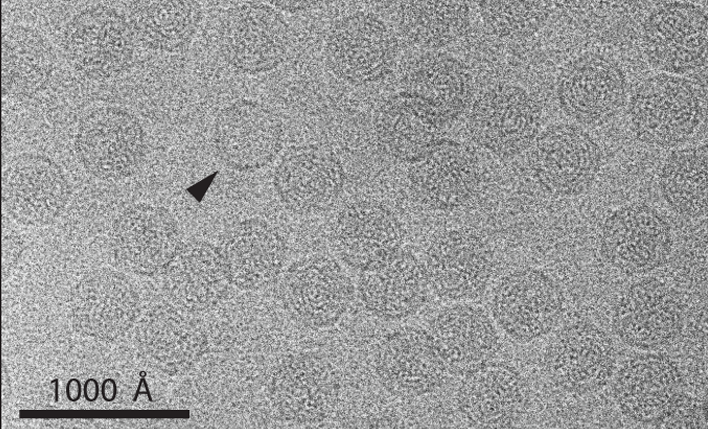
- Cryo-EM of HvV190S virions.

Virus classification
- (unranked): Virus
- Realm: Riboviria
- Kingdom: Orthornavirae
- Phylum: Duplornaviricota
- Class: Chrymotiviricetes
- Order: Ghabrivirales
- Family: Pseudototiviridae
- Genus: Victorivirus

= Victorivirus =

Genus of viruses

Victorivirus is a genus of viruses, in the family Pseudototiviridae. Filamentous fungi serve as natural hosts. There are 32 species in this genus.

== Structure ==
Viruses in Victorivirus are non-enveloped, with icosahedral geometries, and T=2 symmetry. The diameter is around 40 nm. Genomes are linear, around 4.6-6.7kb in length. The genome has 2 open reading frames.

Genus	Structure	Symmetry	Capsid	Genomic arrangement	Genomic segmentation
Victorivirus	Icosahedral	T=2	Non-enveloped	Linear	

== Life cycle ==
Viral replication is cytoplasmic. Entry into the host cell is achieved by virus remains intracellular. Replication follows the double-stranded RNA virus replication model. Double-stranded RNA virus transcription is the method of transcription. Translation takes place by RNA termination-reinitiation. The virus exits the host cell by cell to cell movement. Filamentous fungi serve as the natural host.

Genus	Host details	Tissue tropism	Entry details	Release details	Replication site	Assembly site	Transmission
Victorivirus	Fungi	None	Unknown	Unknown	Cytoplasm	Cytoplasm	Unknown

== Taxonomy ==
The genus Victorivirus includes the following species:

- Victorivirus go
- Victorivirus hachi
- Victorivirus ichi
- Victorivirus jyu
- Victorivirus jyugo
- Victorivirus jyuhachi
- Victorivirus jyuichi
- Victorivirus jyukyu
- Victorivirus jyuni
- Victorivirus jyuroku
- Victorivirus jyusani
- Victorivirus jyushi
- Victorivirus jyushichi
- Victorivirus kyu
- Victorivirus ni
- Victorivirus nijyu
- Victorivirus nijyugo
- Victorivirus nijyuhachi
- Victorivirus nijyuichi
- Victorivirus nijyukyu
- Victorivirus nijyuni
- Victorivirus nijyuroku
- Victorivirus nijyusani
- Victorivirus nijyushi
- Victorivirus nijyushichi
- Victorivirus roku
- Victorivirus sani
- Victorivirus sanjyu
- Victorivirus sanjyuichi
- Victorivirus sanjyuni
- Victorivirus shi
- Victorivirus shichi
