= Betatetravirus =

Virus classification
- (unranked): Virus
- Realm: Riboviria
- Kingdom: Orthornavirae
- Phylum: Kitrinoviricota
- Class: Alsuviricetes
- Order: Hepelivirales
- Family: Alphatetraviridae
- Genus: Betatetravirus

Genus of viruses

Betatetravirus is a genus of viruses, in the family Alphatetraviridae. Moths and butterflies serve as natural hosts. There are seven species in this genus. Infection outcome varies from unapparent to lethal.

== Taxonomy ==
The following species are assigned to the genus, scientific name in parentheses:

- Antheraea eucalypti virus (Betatetravirus antheraeae)
- Darna trima virus (Betatetravirus darnae)
- Dasychira pudibunda virus (Betatetravirus dasychirae)
- Nudaurelia capensis beta virus (Betatetravirus nudaureliae)
- Philosamia cynthia x ricini virus (Betatetravirus philosamiae)
- Pseudoplusia includens virus (Betatetravirus pseudoplusiae)
- Trichoplusia ni virus (Betatetravirus trichoplusiae)

== Structure ==
Viruses in Betatetravirus are non-enveloped, with icosahedral geometries, and T=4 symmetry. The diameter is around 40 nm. Genomes are linear, around 6.5kb in length.

Genus	Structure	Symmetry	Capsid	Genomic arrangement	Genomic segmentation
Betatetravirus	Icosahedral	T=4	Non-enveloped	Linear	Monopartite

== Life cycle ==
Viral replication is cytoplasmic. Entry into the host cell is achieved by penetration into the host cell. Replication follows the positive stranded RNA virus replication model. Positive stranded RNA virus transcription is the method of transcription. Translation takes place by ribosomal skipping. Moths and butterflies serve as the natural host. Transmission routes are oral.

Genus	Host details	Tissue tropism	Entry details	Release details	Replication site	Assembly site	Transmission
Betatetravirus	Moths; butterflies	Midgut	Cell receptor endocytosis	Budding	Cytoplasm	Cytoplasm	Oral
