= Omegatetravirus =

Virus classification
- (unranked): Virus
- Realm: Riboviria
- Kingdom: Orthornavirae
- Phylum: Kitrinoviricota
- Class: Alsuviricetes
- Order: Hepelivirales
- Family: Alphatetraviridae
- Genus: Omegatetravirus

Genus of viruses

Omegatetravirus is a genus of viruses, in the family Alphatetraviridae. Moths and butterflies serve as natural hosts. There are three species in this genus. Infection outcome varies from unapparent to lethal.

== Taxonomy ==
The following species are assigned to the genus, scientific name in parentheses:

- Dendrolimus punctatus virus (Omegatetravirus dendrolimi)
- Helicoverpa armigera stunt virus (Omegatetravirus helicoverpae)
- Nudaurelia capensis omega virus (Omegatetravirus nudaureliae)

== Structure ==
Viruses in Omegatetravirus are non-enveloped, with icosahedral geometries, and T=4 symmetry. The diameter is around 40 nm. Genomes are linear and bipartite, around 2.5kb in length.

Genus	Structure	Symmetry	Capsid	Genomic arrangement	Genomic segmentation
Omegatetravirus	Icosahedral	T=4	Non-enveloped	Linear	Segmented

== Life cycle ==
Viral replication is cytoplasmic. Entry into the host cell is achieved by penetration into the host cell. Replication follows the positive stranded RNA virus replication model. Positive stranded RNA virus transcription is the method of transcription. Translation takes place by leaky scanning. Moths and butterflies serve as the natural host. Transmission routes are oral.

Genus	Host details	Tissue tropism	Entry details	Release details	Replication site	Assembly site	Transmission
Omegatetravirus	Moths; butterflies	Midgut	Cell receptor endocytosis	Budding	Cytoplasm	Cytoplasm	Oral
