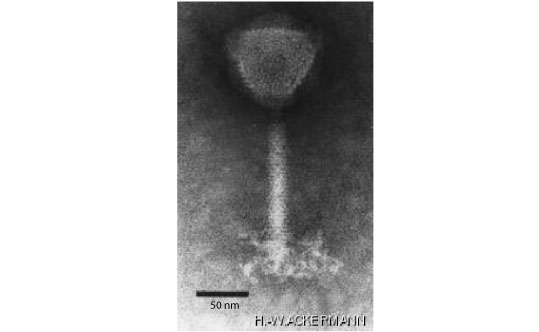
- Virion of genus Okubovirus

Virus classification
- (unranked): Virus
- Realm: Duplodnaviria
- Kingdom: Heunggongvirae
- Phylum: Uroviricota
- Class: Caudoviricetes
- Family: Herelleviridae
- Subfamily: Spounavirinae
- Genus: Okubovirus

= Okubovirus =

Genus of viruses

Okubovirus is a genus of viruses in the family Herelleviridae, in the subfamily Spounavirinae. Bacteria serve as natural hosts. There are two species in this genus.

== Taxonomy ==
The following two species are assigned to the genus:

- Bacillus virus Camphawk
- Bacillus virus SPO1

== Structure ==
Viruses in Okubovirus are non-enveloped, with head-tail geometries, and T=16 symmetry. The diameter is around 108 nm, with a length of 140 nm. Genomes are linear, around 145kb in length. The genome codes for 200 proteins.

Genus	Structure	Symmetry	Capsid	Genomic arrangement	Genomic segmentation
Okubovirus	Head-Tail	T=16	Non-enveloped	Linear	Monopartite

== Life cycle ==
Viral replication is cytoplasmic. Entry into the host cell is achieved by adsorption into the host cell. DNA-templated transcription is the method of transcription. Bacteria serve as the natural host. Transmission routes are passive diffusion.

Genus	Host details	Tissue tropism	Entry details	Release details	Replication site	Assembly site	Transmission
Okubovirus	Bacteria	None	Injection	Lysis	Cytoplasm	Cytoplasm	Passive diffusion

== Taxonomic history ==
- Bacillus phage SP8 was assigned to the family Myoviridae in 1995.
- Bacillus phage SPO1 was assigned to the genus SPO1-like phages in 1996 as type species.
- Myoviridae were assigned to the order Caudovirales in 1998
- SPO1-like phages were renamed SPO1-like viruses in 1999
- Bacillus phage SP8 was merged into Bacillus phage SPO1 in 1999 (as type species) of SPO1-like viruses.
- SPO1-like viruses were assigned to the sub-family Spounavirinae (of Caudovirales) in 2011.
- SPO1-like viruses were renamed Spounalikevirus in 2012.
- Spounalikevirus was renamed to Spo1virus in 2015.
- Spo1virus was renamed to Okubovirus in 2018.
