= Lederbergvirus =

Virus classification
- (unranked): Virus
- Realm: Duplodnaviria
- Kingdom: Heunggongvirae
- Phylum: Uroviricota
- Class: Caudoviricetes
- Genus: Lederbergvirus

Genus of viruses

Lederbergvirus (synonyms P22-like viruses, P22-like phages, P22likevirus) is a genus of viruses in the class Caudoviricetes. Bacteria serve as natural hosts, with transmission achieved through passive diffusion. There are six species in this genus.

== Taxonomy ==
The following six species are assigned to the genus:

- Lederbergvirus BTP1
- Lederbergvirus HK620
- Lederbergvirus P22
- Lederbergvirus SE1Spa
- Lederbergvirus Sf6
- Lederbergvirus ST64T

== Structure ==
Lederbergviruses are nonenveloped, with a head and tail. The head is icosahedral with T=7 symmetry, with a diameter of approximately 60 to 65 nm. The tail is non-contractile with six prominent tail spikes.

Genus	Structure	Symmetry	Capsid	Genomic arrangement	Genomic segmentation
Lederbergvirus	Head-Tail	T=7	Non-enveloped	Linear	Monopartite

== Genome ==
Several species have been fully sequenced. They range between 38k and 42k nucleotides, with 58 to 72 proteins. Complete genomes, as well as several similar unclassified strains are available from

== Life cycle ==
Viral replication is cytoplasmic. The virus attaches to the host cell using its terminal fibers, and ejects the viral DNA into the host periplasm. DNA-templated transcription is the method of transcription. Once the viral genes have been replicated, new virions are assembled in the host's cytoplasm, and mature virions are released via lysis and holin/endolysin/spanin proteins.

Genus	Host details	Tissue tropism	Entry details	Release details	Replication site	Assembly site	Transmission
Lederbergvirus	Bacteria	None	Injection	Lysis	Cytoplasm	Cytoplasm	Passive diffusion

== History ==
According to ICTV's 1996 report, the genus P22likevirus was first accepted under the name P22-like phages, assigned only to family Podoviridae. The whole family was moved to the newly created order Caudovirales in 1998, and the genus was renamed to P22-like viruses in ICTV's seventh report in 1999. In 2012, the genus was renamed again, this time to P22likevirus. The genus was later renamed to Lederbergvirus in 2019.
