= Tunavirus =

Virus classification
- (unranked): Virus
- Realm: Duplodnaviria
- Kingdom: Heunggongvirae
- Phylum: Uroviricota
- Class: Caudoviricetes
- Family: Drexlerviridae
- Subfamily: Tunavirinae
- Genus: Tunavirus

Genus of viruses

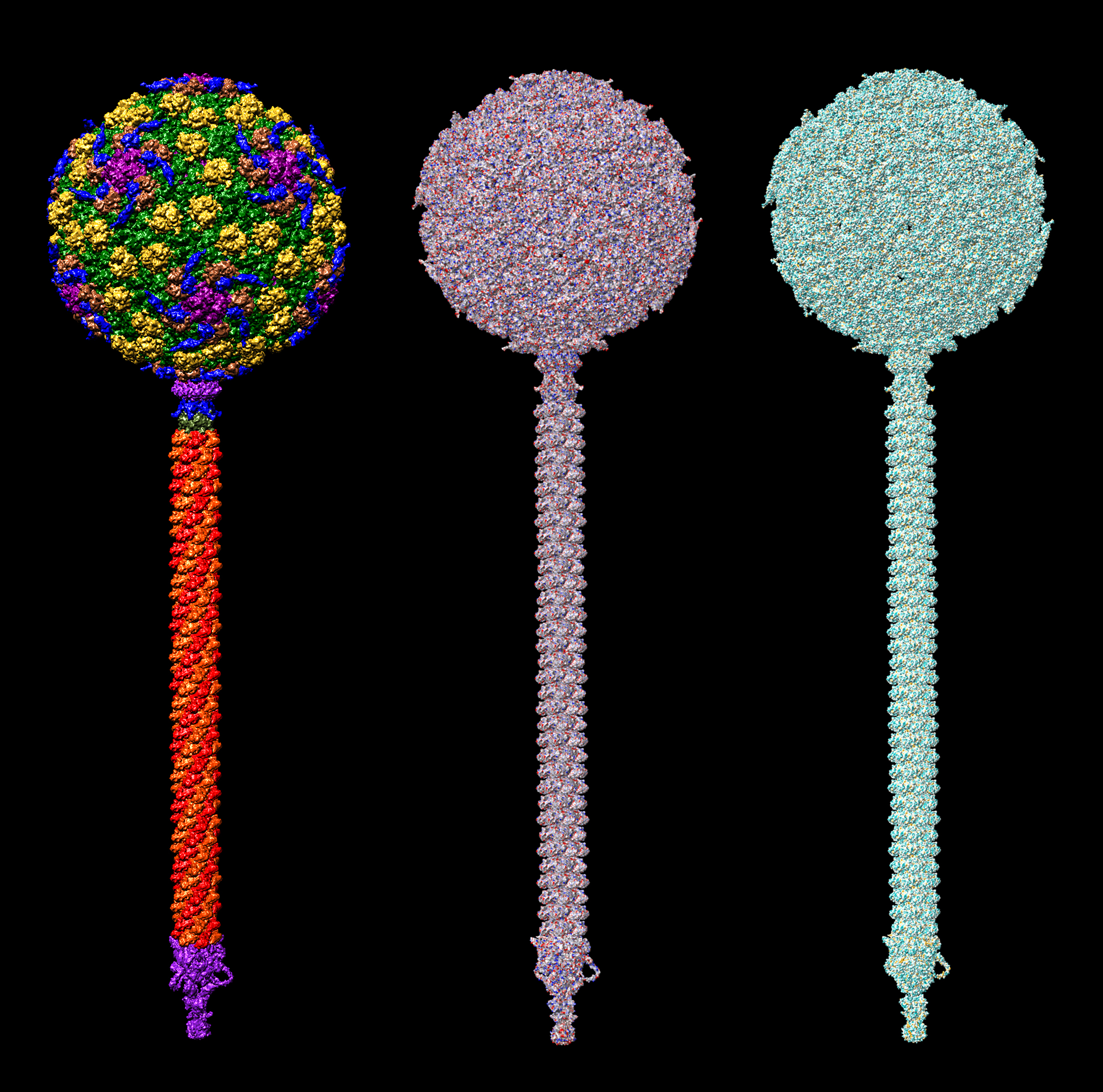
The structure of bacteriophage T1 at atomic resolution is presented here. From left to right: The Chimera software structure is depicted, the Maestro software electrostatics structure is depicted, and the ChimeraX software hydrophilicity structure is depicted in orange-green.

Tunavirus (synonyms T1-like phages, T1-like viruses, Tunalikevirus) is a genus of viruses in the family Drexlerviridae. Bacteria serve as natural hosts. There are 24 species in this genus.

== Taxonomy ==
The genus contains the following species:

- Tunavirus ADB2
- Tunavirus BIFF
- Tunavirus chapo
- Tunavirus CLBP3
- Tunavirus DELF2
- Tunavirus IME18
- Tunavirus ISF001
- Tunavirus ISF002
- Tunavirus JMPW1
- Tunavirus JMPW2
- Tunavirus leonhardeuler
- Tunavirus Lg3
- Tunavirus LHE71
- Tunavirus PSf2
- Tunavirus S202
- Tunavirus SA12KD
- Tunavirus SA30RD
- Tunavirus SA32RD
- Tunavirus Sfin1
- Tunavirus Sfin3
- Tunavirus SH2
- Tunavirus SH6
- Tunavirus Shfl1
- Tunavirus T1

== Structure ==
Tunaviruses are nonenveloped, with a head and tail. The head is about 60 nm in diameter. The tail is about 151 nm long, 8 nm wide. It's non-contractile, flexible, and has four short, kinked terminal fibers.

Genus	Structure	Symmetry	Capsid	Genomic arrangement	Genomic segmentation
Tunavirus	Head-Tail	T=7	Non-enveloped	Linear	Monopartite

== Genome ==
Genomes are circular, around 50kb in length. Bacteriophage T1 and five other species have been fully sequenced. They range between 45-51k nucleotides, with 45-87 proteins. The complete genomes, as well as two other similar, unclassified genomes are available here.

== Life cycle ==
Viral replication is cytoplasmic. The virus attaches to the host cell's adhesion receptor FhuA using its terminal fibers, and ejects the viral DNA into the host cytoplasm via long flexible tail ejection system. Replication follows the replicative transposition model. DNA-templated transcription is the method of transcription. Once the viral genes have been replicated, the procapsid is assembled and packed. The tail is then assembled and the mature virions are released via lysis, and holin/endolysin/spanin proteins. Bacteria serve as the natural host. Transmission routes are passive diffusion.

Genus	Host details	Tissue tropism	Entry details	Release details	Replication site	Assembly site	Transmission
Tunavirus	Bacteria	None	Injection	Lysis	Cytoplasm	Cytoplasm	Passive diffusion

== History ==
According to ICTV's 1996 report, the genus Tunalikevirus was first accepted under the name T1-like phages, assigned only to family Siphoviridae. The whole family was moved to order Caudovirales in 1998, and the genus was renamed to T1-like viruses in ICTV's 7th Report in 1999. In 2012, it was renamed again to Tunalikevirus. The genus was renamed to Tunavirus in 2019 and placed in the newly established family Drexlerviridae.

== Applications ==
Tunavirus T1 survives drying and remains infectious when airborne. As a result, it is used as a surrogate for airborne human viruses in the testing of air filtering and disinfection methods. It is also able to form aerosols.

Tunavirus T1 also has a reputation of being able to contaminate a laboratory's entire collection of E. coli cultures in a matter of hours. George Streisinger and Sydney Brenner have humorously suggested intentionally contaminating letters with T1 to deter excessive requests of phage cultures. An alternative explanation is that some of the contamination was by a more loosely defined collection of "T1-like phages" which includes Lula/phi80.
