= Alphafusellovirus =

Virus classification
- (unranked): Virus
- Family: Fuselloviridae
- Genus: Alphafusellovirus

Synonyms
- Alphafusellovirus ICTV 2012; Fusellovirus ICTV 1993; SSV1 group ICTV 1991; SSV-1 group ICTV 1990

Genus of viruses

Alphafusellovirus is a genus of viruses, in the family Fuselloviridae. Species in the genus Sulfolobus (Sulfolobus shibatae, Sulfolobus solfataricus, and Sulfolobus islandicus) serve as natural hosts. There are seven species in this genus.

== Taxonomy ==
The genus contains the following species, listed by scientific name and followed by the exemplar virus of the species:

- Alphafusellovirus arnavatnense, Sulfolobus spindle-shaped virus 4 (SSV4)
- Alphafusellovirus beppuense, Sulfolobus spindle-shaped virus 1 (SSV1)
- Alphafusellovirus hengillense, Sulfolobus spindle-shaped virus 7 (SSV7)
- Alphafusellovirus hveragerdiense, Sulfolobus spindle-shaped virus 5 (SSV5)
- Alphafusellovirus kamchatkaense, Sulfolobus spindle-shaped virus 9 (SSV9)
- Alphafusellovirus reykjanesense, Sulfolobus spindle-shaped virus 2 (SSV2)
- Alphafusellovirus yellowstonense, Sulfolobus spindle-shaped virus 8 (SSV8)

== Structure ==
Viruses in Alphafusellovirus are enveloped, with lemon-shaped geometries. The diameter is around 60 nm, with a length of 100 nm. Genomes are circular, around 17.3kb in length. Biochemical characterization of SSV1 showed that virions are composed of four virus-encoded structural proteins, VP1 to VP4, as well as one DNA-binding chromatin protein of cellular origin. The virion proteins VP1, VP3, and VP4 undergo posttranslational modification by glycosylation, seemingly at multiple sites. VP1 is also proteolytically processed. SSV1 virions contain glycerol dibiphytanyl glycerol tetraether (GDGT) lipids, which appear to be acquired by the virus in a selective manner from the host cytoplasmic membrane.

Genus	Structure	Symmetry	Capsid	Genomic arrangement	Genomic segmentation
Alphafusellovirus	Lemon-shaped		Enveloped	Circular	Monopartite

== Life cycle ==
Viral replication is cytoplasmic. Entry into the host cell is achieved by adsorption into the host cell. DNA-templated transcription is the method of transcription. Sulfolobus shibatae, sulfolobus solfataricus, and sulfolobus islandicus serve as the natural host. It has been demonstrated that SSV1 is released from the host without causing cell lysis by a budding mechanism, similar to that employed by enveloped eukaryotic viruses.

Genus	Host details	Tissue tropism	Entry details	Release details	Replication site	Assembly site	Transmission
Alphafusellovirus	Archea: thermolophilic	None	Injection	Budding	Cytoplasm	Cytoplasm	Passive diffusion
