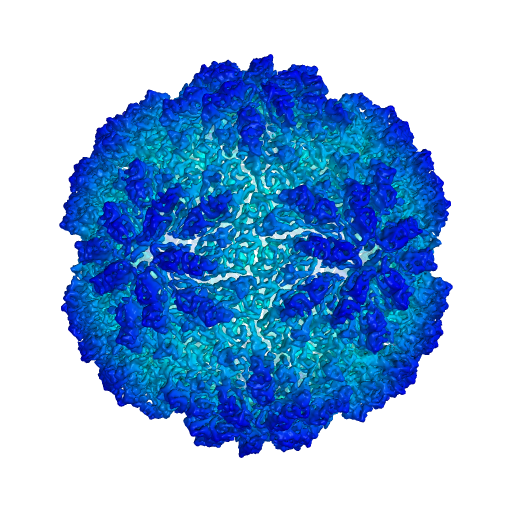
- Cryo-EM image of protein surface of Trichomonas vaginalis virus 1

Virus classification
- (unranked): Virus
- Realm: Riboviria
- Kingdom: Orthornavirae
- Phylum: Duplornaviricota
- Class: Chrymotiviricetes
- Order: Ghabrivirales
- Family: Pseudototiviridae
- Genus: Trichomonasvirus

= Trichomonasvirus =

Genus of viruses

Trichomonasvirus is a genus of viruses, in the family Pseudototiviridae. The protozoan parasite Trichomonas vaginalis serves as the natural host. There are five species in this genus.

== Taxonomy ==
The following four species are assigned to the genus:

- Trichomonasvirus vagiprimus
- Trichomonasvirus vagiquartus
- Trichomonasvirus vagiquintus
- Trichomonasvirus vagisecundus
- Trichomonasvirus vagitertius

== Structure ==
Viruses in Trichomonasvirus are non-enveloped, with icosahedral geometries, and T=2 symmetry. The diameter is around 36 nm. Genomes are linear and non-segmented, around 4.6-4.9kb in length. The genome has 2 open reading frames.

Genus	Structure	Symmetry	Capsid	Genomic arrangement	Genomic segmentation
Trichomonasvirus	Icosahedral	T=2	Non-enveloped	Linear	

== Life cycle ==
Viral replication is cytoplasmic. Entry into the host cell is achieved by attachment to host receptors, which mediates endocytosis. Replication follows the double-stranded RNA virus replication model. Double-stranded RNA virus transcription is the method of transcription. Protozoan parasite Trichomonas vaginalis serve as the natural host.

Genus	Host details	Tissue tropism	Entry details	Release details	Replication site	Assembly site	Transmission
Trichomonasvirus	Protozoa	Endocytosis	Unknown	Unknown	Cytoplasm	Cytoplasm	Unknown
