= Felixounavirus =

Virus classification
- (unranked): Virus
- Realm: Duplodnaviria
- Kingdom: Heunggongvirae
- Phylum: Uroviricota
- Class: Caudoviricetes
- Order: Caudovirales (abolished 2021)
- Family: Myoviridae
- Subfamily: Ounavirinae
- Genus: Felixounavirus

Genus of viruses

Felixounavirus (synonyms: FelixO1likevirus, and Felixounalikevirus) is a genus of viruses in the order Caudovirales, in the family Myoviridae. Bacteria serve as natural hosts, with transmission achieved through passive diffusion. There are currently 16 species in this genus, including the type species Salmonella virus FelixO1.

== Taxonomy ==
The following species are recognized:

- Escherichia virus Alf5
- Escherichia virus AYO145A
- Escherichia virus EC6
- Escherichia virus HY02
- Escherichia virus JH2
- Escherichia virus TP1
- Escherichia virus VpaE1
- Escherichia virus wV8
- Salmonella virus BPS15Q2
- Salmonella virus BPS17L1
- Salmonella virus BPS17W1
- Salmonella virus FelixO1
- Salmonella virus Mushroom
- Salmonella virus Si3
- Salmonella virus SP116
- Salmonella virus UAB87

== Structure ==
Viruses in Felixounavirus are non-enveloped, with head-tail geometries. The diameter is around 73 nm. The tail is around 17 nm wide, 113 nm long, with six long straight terminal fibers and a baseplate. The tail sheath presents a criss-cross pattern with no transverse striations. Genomes are linear, around 86kb in length. The genome codes for 131 proteins.

Genus	Structure	Symmetry	Capsid	Genomic arrangement	Genomic segmentation
Felixounavirus	Head-Tail		Non-enveloped	Linear	Monopartite

== Genome ==
All three species have been fully sequenced and are available from ICTV, including two strains of Erwinia phage phiEa21-4. They range between 84k and 89k nucleotides, with 118 to 140 proteins. The complete genomes are available from here.

== Life cycle ==
The virus attaches to the host cell using its terminal fibers, and ejects the viral DNA into the host cytoplasm via contraction of its tail sheath. Viral replication is cytoplasmic. DNA-templated transcription is the method of transcription. Once the viral genes have been replicated, the procapsid is assembled and packed. The tail is then assembled and the mature virions are released via lysis.

Genus	Host details	Tissue tropism	Entry details	Release details	Replication site	Assembly site	Transmission
Felixounavirus	Bacteria	None	Injection	Lysis	Cytoplasm	Cytoplasm	Passive diffusion

== History ==
According to the ICTV's 2010–11 report, the genus FelixO1likevirus was first accepted as a new genus, at the same time as all three of its contained species . The following year (2012), the name was changed to Felixounalikevirus. This proposal is available here. The genus was later renamed to Felixounavirus.
