= Gammaentomopoxvirus =

Former genus of viruses

Gammaentomopoxvirus was a genus of viruses. The genus was assigned to the family Poxviridae in the subfamily Entomopoxvirinae. The genus contained six species that were all abolished; consequently, the genus was left with no species and also abolished. The species that belonged to the genus were:

- Aedes aegypti entomopoxvirus
- Camptochironomus tentans entomopoxvirus
- Chironomus attenuatus entomopoxvirus
- Chironomus luridus entomopoxvirus
- Chironomus plumosus entomopoxvirus
- Goeldichironomus holoprasinus entomopoxvirus
