= Fuselloviridae =

Virus classification
- (unranked): Virus
- Family: Fuselloviridae

Genera
- Alphafusellovirus; Betafusellovirus

Synonyms
- Fuselloviridae ICTV 1993; SSV1-type phages ICTV 1991; SSV-1 family ICTV 1990

Family of viruses

Fuselloviridae is a family of viruses. Sulfolobus species, specifically shibatae, solfataricus, and islandicus, serve as natural hosts. There are two genera in the family. Viruses in Fuselloviridae are ubiquitous in high-temperature (≥70 °C), acidic (pH ≤4) hot springs around the world.

== Taxonomy ==
The family contains the following genera:

- Alphafusellovirus
- Betafusellovirus

== Structure ==
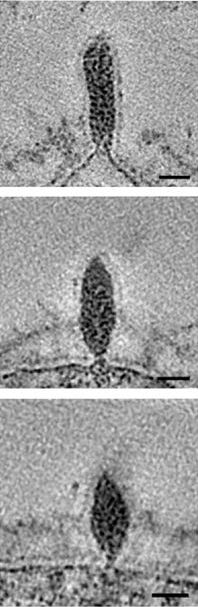
Three slices through tomograms showing an SSV1 virion attacheing to S. shibatae host cell surface. Scale bars, 20 nm.

Viruses in Fuselloviridae are enveloped, with lemon-shaped geometries. The diameter is around 60 nm, with a length of 100 nm. Genomes consist of double-stranded circular DNA, around 17.3 kb in length. Biochemical characterization of SSV1, a prototypical fusellovirus, showed that virions are composed of four virus-encoded structural proteins, VP1 to VP4, as well as one DNA-binding chromatin protein of cellular origin. The virion proteins VP1, VP3, and VP4 undergo posttranslational modification by glycosylation, seemingly at multiple sites. VP1 is also proteolytically processed. SSV1 virions contain glycerol dibiphytanyl glycerol tetraether (GDGT) lipids, which appear to be acquired by the virus in a selective manner from the host cytoplasmic membrane.

Genus	Structure	Symmetry	Capsid	Genomic arrangement	Genomic segmentation
Alphafusellovirus	Lemon-shaped		Enveloped	Circular	Monopartite
Betafusellovirus	Lemon-shaped		Enveloped	Circular	Monopartite

== Life cycle ==
Viral replication is cytoplasmic. Entry into the host cell is achieved by adsorption into the host cell. DNA templated transcription is the method of transcription. Sulfolobus shibatae, S. solfataricus, and S. islandicus serve as the natural host. Fuselloviruses are released from the host without causing cell lysis by a budding mechanism, similar to that employed by enveloped eukaryotic viruses.

Genus	Host details	Tissue tropism	Entry details	Release details	Replication site	Assembly site	Transmission
Alphafusellovirus	Archea: thermolophilic	None	Injection	Budding	Cytoplasm	Cytoplasm	Passive diffusion
Betafusellovirus	Archea: thermolophilic	None	Injection	Budding	Cytoplasm	Cytoplasm	Passive diffusion
