= Unicornvirus =

Virus classification
- (unranked): Virus
- Realm: Duplodnaviria
- Kingdom: Heunggongvirae
- Phylum: Uroviricota
- Class: Caudoviricetes
- Subfamily: Weiservirinae
- Genus: Unicornvirus

Species
- Unicornvirus bryler; Unicornvirus krueger; Unicornvirus shandong1; Unicornvirus unicorn; Unicornvirus ximenita

Genus of viruses

Unicornvirus is a genus of bacteriophage viruses in the class Caudoviricetes. The genus was named for the first virus of this type, Unicornvirus unicorn, which was originally called "Mycobacterium phage Unicorn".

Species in this genus were isolated from the host Mycobacterium smegmatis. The genomes range from 56=61 kb with ~66% GC-content.

Most were originally isolated from soil samples obtained in the United States. U. unicorn was originally sampled in the Great Dismal Swamp. U. kreuger was originally found in soil at Hope College and named after an educator. U. bryler was originally found in Spokane, Washington and named as a blend word of the discoverers given names, Brian and Tyler. U. ximenita was originally found in soil in Fort Collins, Colorado.

== Taxonomy ==
The genus has the following phylogenetic tree:

- - - - Anayavirus
      - Unicornvirus
        - - - - - - Unicornvirus krueger
                  - Unicornvirus ximenita
              - - - Unicornvirus unicorn
                  - Unicornvirus bryler
          - Unicornvirus shandong1
  - Amginevirus
