= Twortvirus =

Virus classification
- (unranked): Virus
- Realm: Duplodnaviria
- Kingdom: Heunggongvirae
- Phylum: Uroviricota
- Class: Caudoviricetes
- Family: Herelleviridae
- Subfamily: Twortvirinae
- Genus: Twortvirus

Genus of viruses

Twortvirus is a genus of viruses in the family Herelleviridae, in the subfamily Twortvirinae. Bacteria serve as natural hosts. There is only one species in this genus: Staphylococcus phage Twort (Twortvirus twort).

Twortvirus is named after English bacteriologist Frederick Twort.

== Structure ==
Viruses in this genus are nonenveloped, with a head and tail. The head is approximately 84 nm to 94 nm in diameter and T=16 symmetry. The tail is around 140 nm to 219 nm long, has 6 long terminal fibers, 6 short spikes, globular structures at the tip, and a double base plate. The tail is enclosed in a sheath, which loosens and slides around the tail core upon contraction.

Genus	Structure	Symmetry	Capsid	Genomic arrangement	Genomic segmentation
Twortvirus	Head-Tail	T=16	Non-enveloped	Linear	Monopartite

== Life cycle ==
Viral replication is cytoplasmic. The virus attaches to the host cell using its tail fibers, and ejects the viral DNA into the host cytoplasm via contraction of its tail sheath. DNA-templated transcription is the method of transcription. Once the viral genes have been replicated, the procapsid is assembled and packed. The tail is then assembled and the mature virions are released via lysis. Bacteria serve as the natural host. Transmission routes are passive diffusion.

Genus	Host details	Tissue tropism	Entry details	Release details	Replication site	Assembly site	Transmission
Twortvirus	Bacteria	None	Injection	Lysis	Cytoplasm	Cytoplasm	Passive diffusion

== History ==
The genus Twortlikevirus was first accepted as a new genus, at the same time as all five of its contained species as well as its containing sub-family Peduovirinae, in ICTV's 2010–11 report. The new genus was proposed in 2009. The genus was renamed to Twortvirus in 2016.

== Genome ==
Genomes are linear, around 130-140kb in length. The genome codes for 190 to 215 proteins. Twort's genome is available on NCBI's website. Genomes range between 130k and 149k nucleotides, with 190 to 233 proteins. All complete genomes, as well as several additional "unclassified" virus genomes, are available online.
