= Rauchvirus =

Virus classification
- (unranked): Virus
- Realm: Duplodnaviria
- Kingdom: Heunggongvirae
- Phylum: Uroviricota
- Class: Caudoviricetes
- Genus: Rauchvirus

Synonyms
- BPP-1-like viruses; Bppunalikevirus

Genus of viruses

Rauchvirus is a genus of viruses in the class Caudoviricetes. Bacteria serve as natural hosts. The genus contains only one species: Rauchvirus BPP1.

== Structure ==
Viruses in Rauchvirus are non-enveloped, with icosahedral and head-tail geometries, and T=7 symmetry. The diameter is around 67 nm. Genomes are linear, around 42kb in length, and usually encodes about 50 proteins. The Bordetella phages of this genus contains an RNA-directed DNA polymerase which plays a role in tropism.

The genomes are linear, terminally redundant, and circularly with approximately 40. There are 53 proteins, and genes are arrayed in two transcriptional units, one on the negative strand, which is involved in regulation and recombination; the other is located on the positive strand which is involved in packaging, morphogenesis, lysis and integration.

Genus	Structure	Symmetry	Capsid	Genomic arrangement	Genomic segmentation
Rauchvirus	Head-Tail	T=7	Non-enveloped	Linear	Monopartite

== Life cycle ==
Viral replication is cytoplasmic. Entry into the host cell is achieved by adsorption into the host cell. DNA-templated transcription is the method of transcription. Bacteria serve as the natural host. Transmission routes are passive diffusion.

Genus	Host details	Tissue tropism	Entry details	Release details	Replication site	Assembly site	Transmission
Rauchvirus	Bacteria	None	Injection	Lysis	Cytoplasm	Cytoplasm	Passive diffusion
