= Bixzunavirus =

Virus classification
- (unranked): Virus
- Realm: Duplodnaviria
- Kingdom: Heunggongvirae
- Phylum: Uroviricota
- Class: Caudoviricetes
- Subfamily: Ceeclamvirinae
- Genus: Bixzunavirus

Genus of viruses

Bixzunavirus (synonyms: I3-likeviruses and I3likevirus) is a genus of viruses in the subfamily Ceeclamvirinae. Bacteria serve as natural hosts, with transmission achieved through passive diffusion. There are 18 species in this genus. Bixzunavirus were previously classified under the order Caudovirales, in the family Myoviridae.

== Taxonomy ==
The following species are recognized:

- Bixzunavirus alice
- Bixzunavirus astraea
- Bixzunavirus bigswole
- Bixzunavirus Bxz1
- Bixzunavirus cane17
- Bixzunavirus charlieB
- Bixzunavirus dandelion
- Bixzunavirus hyro
- Bixzunavirus I3
- Bixzunavirus lukilu
- Bixzunavirus mangeria
- Bixzunavirus nappy
- Bixzunavirus noodletree
- Bixzunavirus qbert
- Bixzunavirus quasimodo
- Bixzunavirus sauce
- Bixzunavirus sebata
- Bixzunavirus tonenili

== Structure ==
Bixzunaviruses are nonenveloped, with a head and tail. The head has a diameter between 75 and 95 nm, with a length of 80 nm. The tail is around 53 nm long.

Genus	Structure	Symmetry	Capsid	Genomic arrangement	Genomic segmentation
Bixzunavirus	Head-Tail		Non-enveloped	Linear	Monopartite

== Genome ==
The sequence for Mycobacterium virus I3 is not available from ICTV. Fifteen similar but unclassified viruses are available, ranging between 153k and 158k nucleotides, with 218 to 241 proteins. The complete genomes are available here.

== Life cycle ==
The virus attaches to the host cell using its terminal fibers, and ejects the viral DNA into the host cytoplasm via contraction of its tail sheath. Viral replication is cytoplasmic. DNA-templated transcription is the method of transcription. Once the viral genes have been replicated, the procapsid is assembled and packed. The tail is then assembled and the mature virions are released via lysis. Bacteria serve as the natural host. Transmission route is passive diffusion.

Genus	Host details	Tissue tropism	Entry details	Release details	Replication site	Assembly site	Transmission
Bixzunavirus	Bacteria	None	Injection	Lysis	Cytoplasm	Cytoplasm	Passive diffusion

== History ==
According to the ICTV's 2009 report, the genus I3-like viruses was first accepted as a new genus, at the same time as its type species. In 2012, the name was changed to I3likevirus. The genus was later renamed to Bixzunavirus.
