= Uetakevirus =

Virus classification
- (unranked): Virus
- Realm: Duplodnaviria
- Kingdom: Heunggongvirae
- Phylum: Uroviricota
- Class: Caudoviricetes
- Genus: Uetakevirus

Synonyms
- Epsilon15-like viruses; Epsilon15likevirus

Genus of viruses

Uetakevirus is a genus of viruses in the class Caudoviricetes. Bacteria serve as natural hosts. There are four species in this genus. These phages are temperate and infect Salmonella (Salmonella virus Epsilon15) and Escherichia coli (Escherichia phage PhiV10).

== Taxonomy ==
The following species are assigned to the genus:

- Uetakevirus epsilon15
- Uetakevirus PAS61
- Uetakevirus phiV10
- Uetakevirus SPN1S

== Structure ==
Viruses in Uetakevirus are non-enveloped, with icosahedral and Head-tail geometries, and T=7 symmetry. The diameter is around 70 nm with a short tail of about 15 nm and tailspikes surrounding an external tail hub. The genomes of these phages are linear double stranded DNA (~40kilobases), terminally redundant and circularly permuted. Transcriptional units separate the genome in an early and a late region, one on the negative strand (regulation and recombination) and the one on the positive strand (packaging, morphogenesis, lysis and integration). Genomes are around 40kb in length.

Genus	Structure	Symmetry	Capsid	Genomic arrangement	Genomic segmentation
Uetakevirus	Head-Tail	T=7	Non-enveloped	Linear	Monopartite

== Life cycle ==
Viral replication is cytoplasmic. Entry into the host cell is achieved by adsorption into the host cell. Dna templated transcription is the method of transcription. Bacteria serve as the natural host. Transmission routes are passive diffusion.

Genus	Host details	Tissue tropism	Entry details	Release details	Replication site	Assembly site	Transmission
Uetakevirus	Bacteria	None	Injection	Lysis	Cytoplasm	Cytoplasm	Passive diffusion
