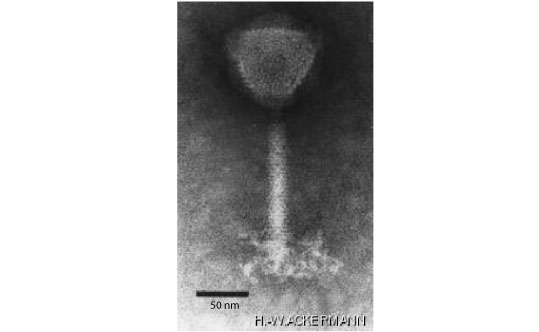
- Virion of genus Okubovirus

Virus classification
- (unranked): Virus
- Realm: Duplodnaviria
- Kingdom: Heunggongvirae
- Phylum: Uroviricota
- Class: Caudoviricetes
- Family: Herelleviridae

Subfamilies and genera
- See text

= Herelleviridae =

Family of viruses

Herelleviridae is a family of bacterial viruses of the order Caudovirales infecting members of the phylum Firmicutes. The family has five subfamilies and 34 genera. On average, replication of family members is supported by 70% isolates of primary host species.

== Etymology ==
The family's name, Herelle is in honor of Félix d'Hérelle, a French-Canadian microbiologist, the suffix -viridae is the standard suffix for virus families.

== Taxonomy ==
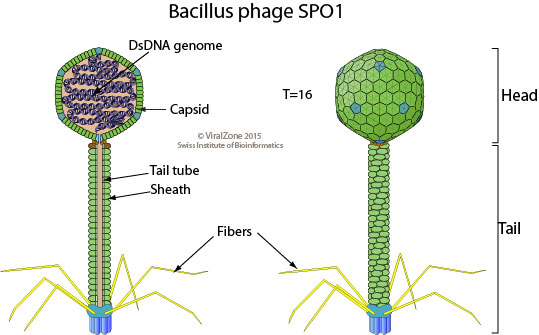
Schematic drawing of a Bacillus phage SPO1 virion of the genus Okubovirus, cross section and lateral view.

The following subfamilies and genera are assigned to Herelleviridae (-virinae denotes subfamily and -virus denotes genus):

- Bastillevirinae
  - Agatevirus
  - Bastillevirus
  - Bequatrovirus
  - Caeruleovirus
  - Eldridgevirus
  - Goettingenvirus
  - Grisebachstrassevirus
  - Jeonjuvirus
  - Matervirus
  - Moonbeamvirus
  - Nitunavirus
  - Shalavirus
  - Siophivirus
  - Tsarbombavirus
  - Wphvirus
- Brockvirinae
  - Kochikohdavirus
  - Schiekvirus
- Jasinkavirinae
  - Pecentumvirus
- Spounavirinae
  - Okubovirus
  - Siminovitchvirus
- Twortvirinae
  - Baoshanvirus
  - Kayvirus
  - Sciuriunavirus
  - Sepunavirus
  - Silviavirus
  - Twortvirus

The following genera are unassigned to a subfamily:

- Elpedvirus
- Harbinvirus
- Hopescreekvirus
- Klumppvirus
- Mooreparkvirus
- Salchichonvirus
- Tybeckvirus
- Watanabevirus
