= Bruynoghevirus =

Virus classification
- (unranked): Virus
- Realm: Duplodnaviria
- Kingdom: Heunggongvirae
- Phylum: Uroviricota
- Class: Caudoviricetes
- Genus: Bruynoghevirus

Synonyms
- Luz24-like viruses; Luz24likevirus

Genus of viruses

Bruynoghevirus is a genus of viruses in the order Caudovirales. Bacteria serve as natural hosts. There are seven species in this genus.

== Taxonomy ==
The following species are recognized:

- Pseudomonas virus Ab22
- Pseudomonas virus CHU
- Pseudomonas virus LUZ24
- Pseudomonas virus PAA2
- Pseudomonas virus PaP3
- Pseudomonas virus PaP4
- Pseudomonas virus TL

== Structure ==
Viruses in Bruynoghevirus are non-enveloped, with an icosahedral head (63 nm) and a short tail (12x8 nm). Although these phages produce small and turbid plaques, all attempts to isolate stable lysogenic P. aeruginosa clones failed. In addition, their genome (around 45kb) does not encode obvious genes indicative of lysogeny. Genomes are linear, around 45kb in length.

| Genus | Structure | Symmetry | Capsid | Genomic arrangement | Genomic segmentation |
|---|---|---|---|---|---|
| Bruynoghevirus | Head-Tail | | Non-enveloped | Linear | Monopartite |

== Life cycle ==
Viral replication is cytoplasmic. Entry into the host cell is achieved by adsorption into the host cell. DNA templated transcription is the method of transcription. Bacteria serve as the natural host. Transmission routes are passive diffusion.

| Genus | Host details | Tissue tropism | Entry details | Release details | Replication site | Assembly site | Transmission |
|---|---|---|---|---|---|---|---|
| Bruynoghevirus | Bacteria | None | Injection | Lysis | Cytoplasm | Cytoplasm | Passive diffusion |
