= Kuravirus =

Virus classification
- (unranked): Virus
- Realm: Duplodnaviria
- Kingdom: Heunggongvirae
- Phylum: Uroviricota
- Class: Caudoviricetes
- Family: Mktvariviridae
- Subfamily: Gordonclarkvirinae
- Genus: Kuravirus

Synonyms
- Phieco32-like viruses Phieco32likevirus; Phieco32virus

Genus of viruses

Kuravirus is a genus of viruses in the subfamily Gordonclarkvirinae, family Mktvariviridae.

== Taxonomy ==
The genus contains the following species:

- Kuravirus CHD5UKE1
- Kuravirus EcoN5
- Kuravirus ES17
- Kuravirus IMEP8
- Kuravirus kv1721
- Kuravirus LAMP
- Kuravirus MN03
- Kuravirus MN05
- Kuravirus myPSH1131
- Kuravirus myPSH2311
- Kuravirus NJ01
- Kuravirus O18011
- Kuravirus paul
- Kuravirus pECN12032Af1
- Kuravirus phiEco32
- Kuravirus SDYTW1F1223
- Kuravirus SGF2
- Kuravirus SR02
- Kuravirus SU10
- Kuravirus WFI101126
- Kuravirus XT18
- Kuravirus YF01
