= Enquatrovirus =

Virus classification
- (unranked): Virus
- Realm: Duplodnaviria
- Kingdom: Heunggongvirae
- Phylum: Uroviricota
- Class: Caudoviricetes
- Family: Schitoviridae
- Subfamily: Enquatrovirinae
- Genus: Enquatrovirus

Genus of viruses

Enquatrovirus is a genus of bacteriophages in the subfamily Enquatrovirinae, family Schitoviridae. Bacteria serve as natural hosts. There is only one species in this genus: Enquatrovirus N4.

Enquatrovirus N4 was originally isolated from sewers in Genoa, Italy and infects Escherichia coli K-12. Recently, a number of genetically related phages were isolated, infecting Silicibacter and Sulfitobacter (DSS3ɸ2 and EE36ɸ1) as well as a number of Pseudomonas phages (LUZ7, LIT1 and PEV2)

== Structure ==
The virus's virion have icosahedral (T=9) heads ~70 nm and short tails (10 nm), and contain short fibers originating from the junction between the head and tail. All the phages of this genus are strictly virulent and contain a linear dsDNA genome (with terminal repeats) in the range of 70-75kb.

Genus	Structure	Symmetry	Capsid	Genomic arrangement	Genomic segmentation
Enquatrovirus	Head-Tail	T=9	Non-enveloped	Linear	Monopartite

== Life cycle ==
Viral replication is cytoplasmic. Entry into the host cell is achieved by adsorption into the host cell. Dna templated transcription is the method of transcription. Bacteria serve as the natural host. Transmission routes are passive diffusion.

Genus	Host details	Tissue tropism	Entry details	Release details	Replication site	Assembly site	Transmission
Enquatrovirus	Bacteria	None	Injection	Lysis	Cytoplasm	Cytoplasm	Passive diffusion

== RNA polymerases ==
A remarkable feature of this clade of phages is the use of three distinct RNA polymerases during its infection cycle. A giant virion-encapsulated RNAP polymerase which is co-injected (early transcription), a heterodimeric phage RNA polymerase (middle region) and the host RNA polymerase (recognizes late promoters).
