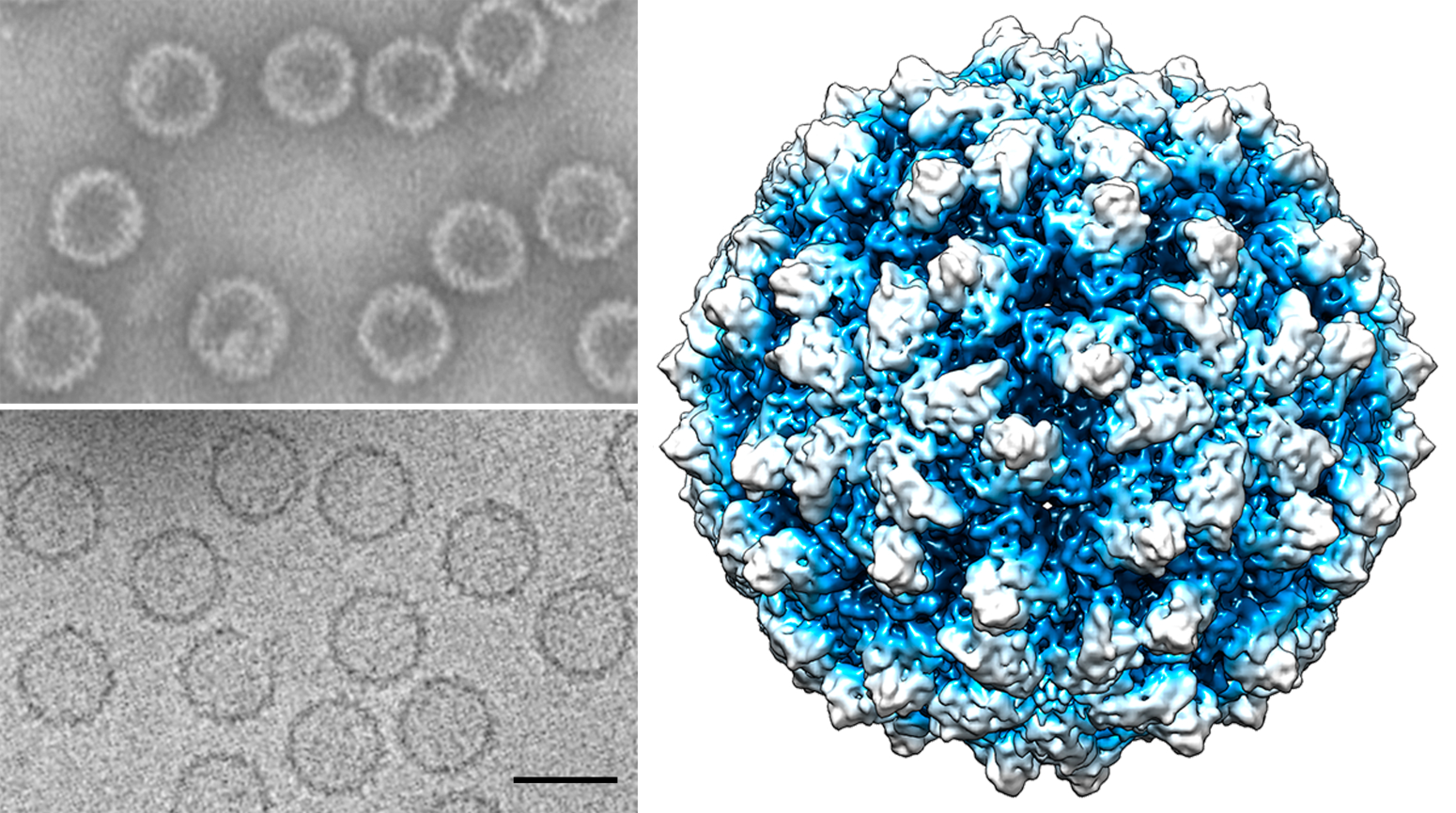
- (Left) Electron micrographs of the Rosellinia necatrix quadrivirus 1, bar = 50 nm. (Right) Three-dimensional cryo-electron microscopy reconstruction of RnQV1 virions at 8Å resolution.

Virus classification
- (unranked): Virus
- Realm: Riboviria
- Kingdom: Orthornavirae
- Phylum: Duplornaviricota
- Class: Chrymotiviricetes
- Order: Ghabrivirales
- Family: Quadriviridae
- Genus: Quadrivirus

= Quadriviridae =

Family of viruses

Quadriviridae is a family of double-stranded RNA viruses with a single genus Quadrivirus. The fungi Rosellinia necatrix serves as a natural host. The name of the group derives from the quadripartite genome of its members where in Latin quad means four. The genus has three species.

== Structure ==
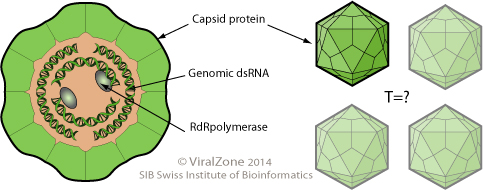
Schematic diagram of Quadriviridae virions. The four genomic segments may be separately encapsulated.

Mycoviruses in the family Quadriviridae have a non-enveloped isometric capsid which consists of 60 copies of heterodimers of the structural proteins P2 and P4. The diameter of the capsid is around 48 nm.

== Genome ==
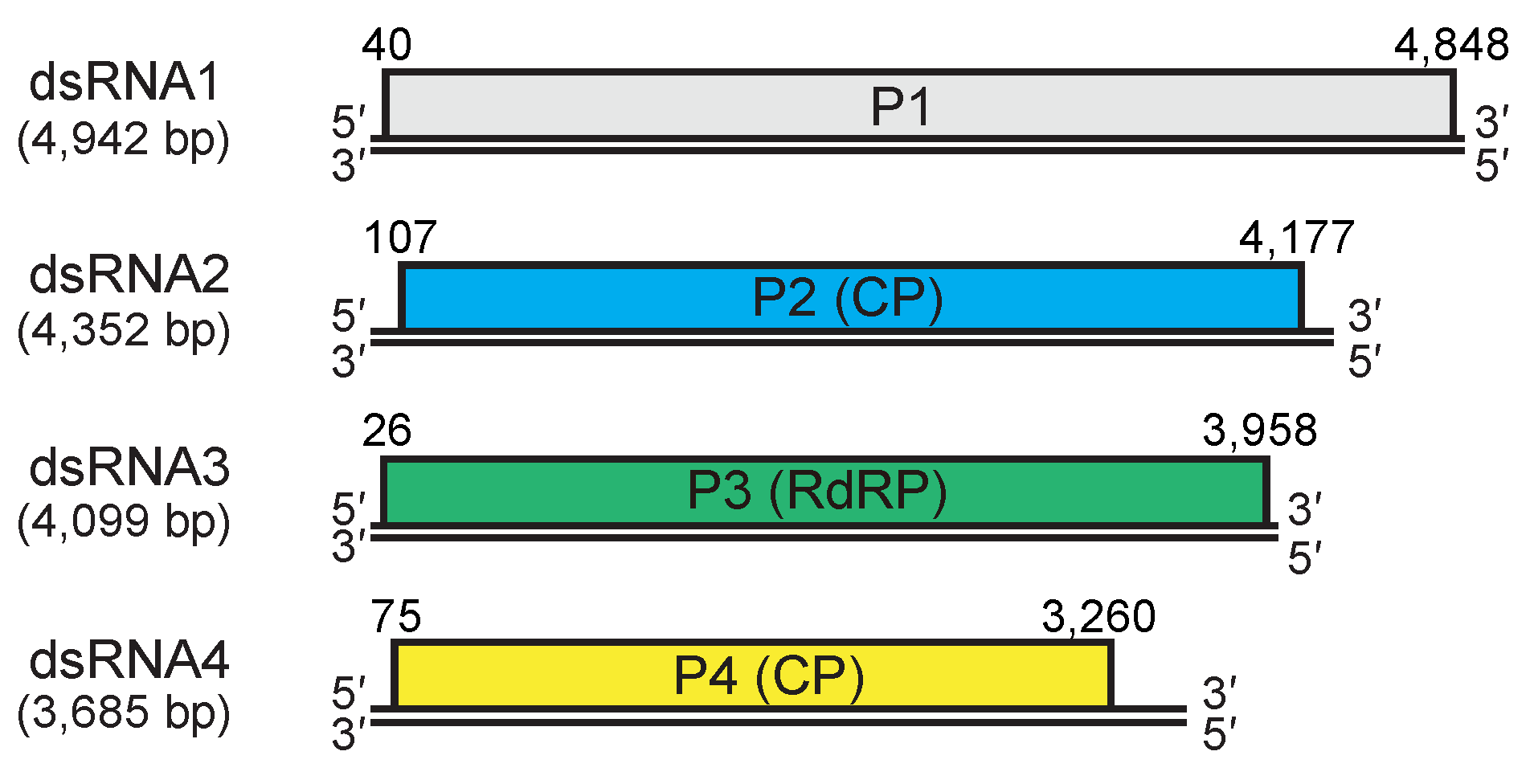
Genome of Rosellinia necatrix quadrivirus 1

Family member genomes are composed of double-stranded RNA. They are divided in to four segments which each code for a protein. The length of the different segments are between 3.5 and 5.0 kbp. The total genome is around 16.8 kbp. Inside the capsid with the genome there is also the RNA-dependent RNA polymerase.

== Life cycle ==
Quadriviruses are transmitted internally. They are propagated during cell division and hyphal anastomosis. Viral replication occurs in the cytoplasm. It follows the double-stranded RNA virus replication model. Double-stranded RNA virus transcription is the method of transcription. The fungi Rosellinia necatrix serves as a natural host.

== Taxonomy ==
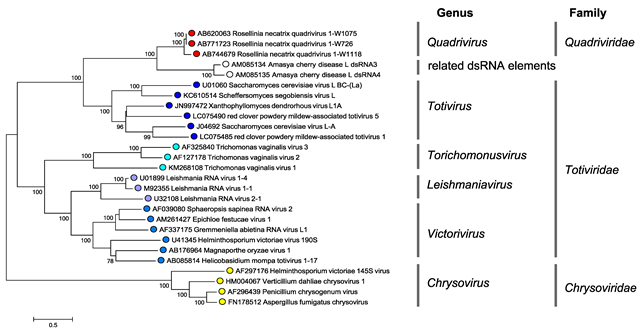
Phylogenetic tree of quadriviruses, chrysoviruses and some totiviruses

The family Quadrivirdae has one genus Quadrivirus, which contains the following species:

- Quadrivirus ichi (Rosellinia necatrix quadrivirus 1)
- Quadrivirus ni
- Quadrivirus sani
