= Whi2 =

Whi2 or Whiskey 2 is a 55 kDa globular, scaffold protein located to cell periphery in Saccharomyces cerevisiae, which plays an essential role in regulating stress response pathways, apparently by passing input signals about nutrient availability on to stress responsive elements and autophagy/mitophagy mechanisms. It is encoded by a 1.46 kbp gene located on chromosome 15. Whi2p shares a conserved BTB structure domain to the family of human potassium channel tetramerization domain proteins (KCTDs). KCTD family members have been associated with several type of cancers and epilepsy disorders.

== Functional mechanism ==
Upon complexing with plasma membrane associated phosphatase Psr1 and Psr2, Whi2 induces general stress response by dephosphorylating general stress response transcription factor Msn2. Whi2 is essential for Msn2 activity, moreover activation by Whi2 is dominant and independent of the PKA and TOR activation pathways. Additionally, experiments suggests Whi2 plays a role in Ras2 deactivation or degradation during nutrient depletion. Whi2-Psr1/Psr2 complex is also required for inhibition of TORC1 activity under conditions of nutrient deprivation. Furthermore, a striking characteristic of Whi2 is the repeated observation of spontaneous mutations in the WHI2 gene in the yeast library of knock-out strains and in genome evolutionary studies. Recently a novel function of Whi2-Psr1/Psr2 complex identified in balancing cell population and regulating expansion of cells with fitness advantage in dense yeast populations.
