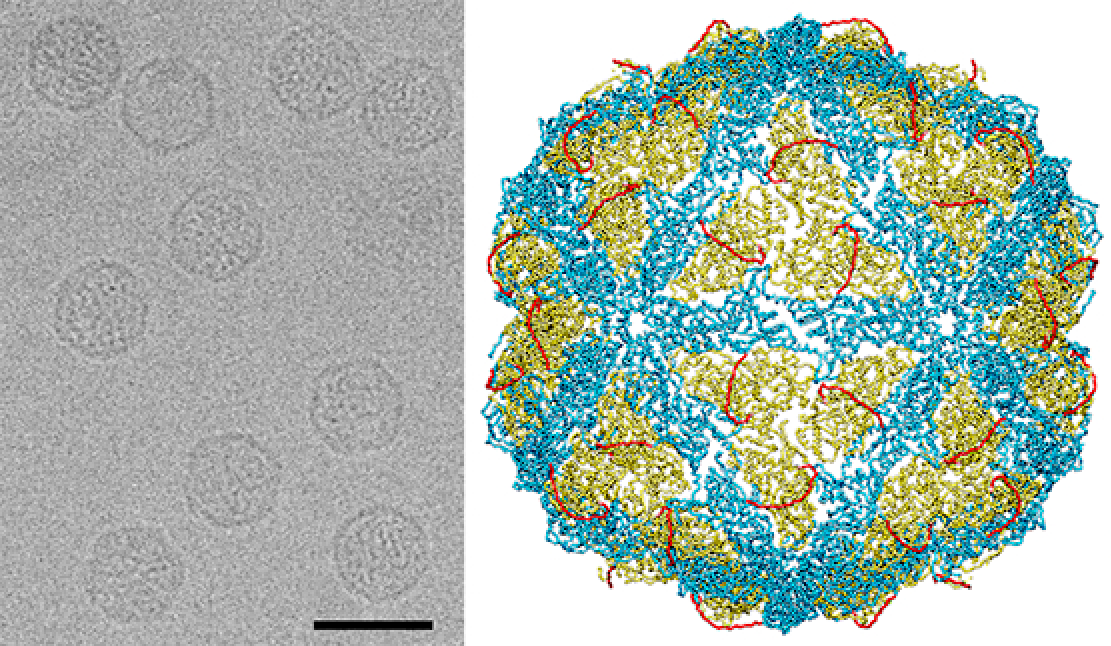
- Cryo-EM reconstruction of penicillium chrysogenum virus (PcV) virions

Virus classification
- (unranked): Virus
- Realm: Riboviria
- Kingdom: Orthornavirae
- Phylum: Duplornaviricota
- Class: Chrymotiviricetes
- Order: Ghabrivirales
- Family: Chrysoviridae
- Genus: Alphachrysovirus

= Alphachrysovirus =

Genus of viruses

Alphachrysovirus is a genus of double-stranded RNA viruses. It is one of two genera in the family Chrysoviridae. They infect fungi, in particular Penicillium. Their name is derived from the Greek word chrysos which means yellow-green. There are 20 species in this genus.

== Structure ==
Viruses in the genus Alphachrysovirus are non-enveloped, with icosahedral geometries, and T=1, T=2 symmetry. Their diameter is around 35–40 nm.

== Genome ==
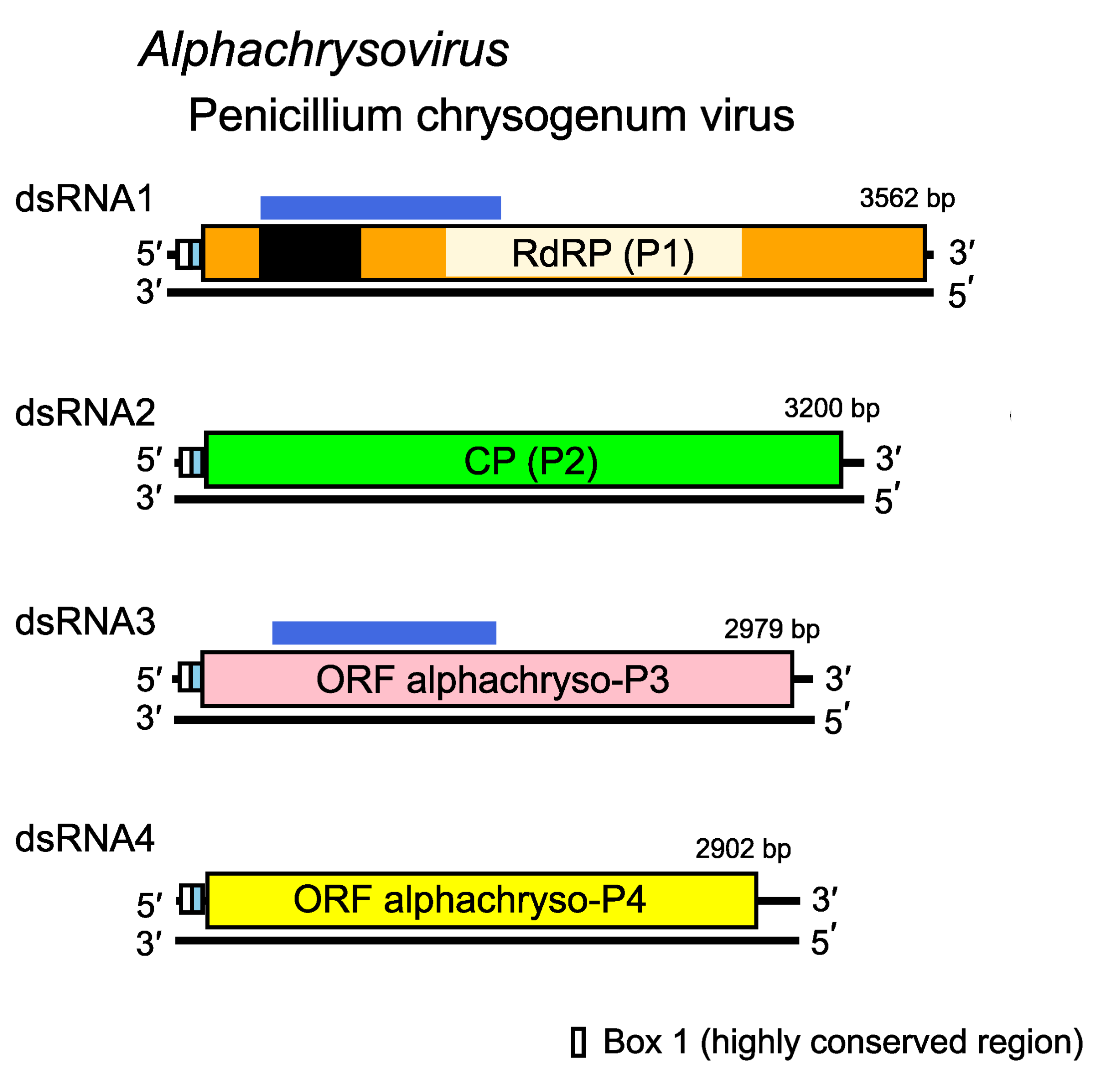
Genome organization of Penicillium chrysogenum virus (PcV)

Genomes are linear double-stranded RNA which is around 12.5 kbp in length. The genome codes for four proteins. The genome has three double stranded RNA segments. All have extended highly conserved terminal sequences at both ends.

== Life cycle ==
Viral replication is cytoplasmic. Entry into the host cell is achieved by penetration into the host cell. Replication follows the double-stranded RNA virus replication model. Double-stranded RNA virus transcription is the method of transcription. The virus exits the host cell by cell to cell movement. Fungi serve as the natural host.

Genus	Host details	Tissue tropism	Entry details	Release details	Replication site	Assembly site	Transmission
Alphachrysovirus	Fungi	None	Cytoplasmic exchange; sporogenesis; Hyphal anastomosis	Cytoplasmic exchange; sporogenesis; Hyphal anastomosis	Cytoplasm	Cytoplasm	Cytoplasmic exchange; sporogenesis; Hyphal anastomosis

== Taxonomy ==
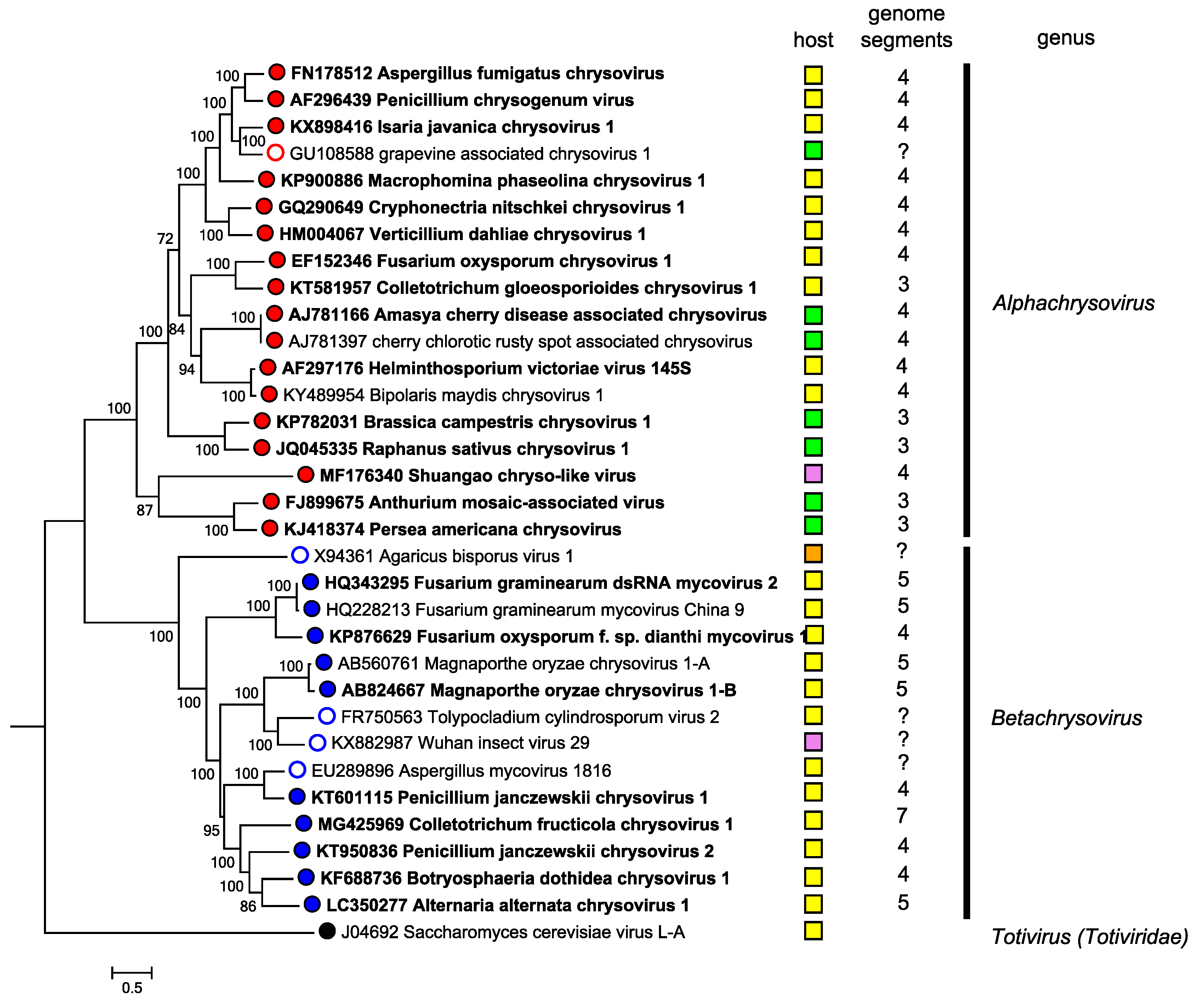
Phylogenetic tree of members of the family Chrysoviridae

The following species are recognized:

- Alphachrysovirus anthurii
- Alphachrysovirus aspergilli
- Alphachrysovirus brassicae
- Alphachrysovirus cerasi
- Alphachrysovirus chrysothricis
- Alphachrysovirus colletotrichi
- Alphachrysovirus cryphonectriae
- Alphachrysovirus fusarii
- Alphachrysovirus helminthosporii
- Alphachrysovirus isariae
- Alphachrysovirus macrophominae
- Alphachrysovirus penicillii
- Alphachrysovirus penicompacti
- Alphachrysovirus penifulvi
- Alphachrysovirus perseae
- Alphachrysovirus raphani
- Alphachrysovirus saladoense
- Alphachrysovirus shuangaoense
- Alphachrysovirus verticillii
- Alphachrysovirus zeae
