= Yeast deletion project =

The yeast deletion project, formally the Saccharomyces Genome Deletion Project, is a project to create data for a near-complete collection of gene-deletion mutants of the yeast Saccharomyces cerevisiae. Each strain carries a precise deletion of one of the genes in the genome. This allows researchers to determine what each gene does by comparing the mutated yeast to the behavior of normal yeast. Gene deletion, or gene knockout, is one of the main ways in which the function of genes are discovered. Many of the deletion mutations are sold by the biotech firm Invitrogen.

== See also ==
- Synthetic genetic array
