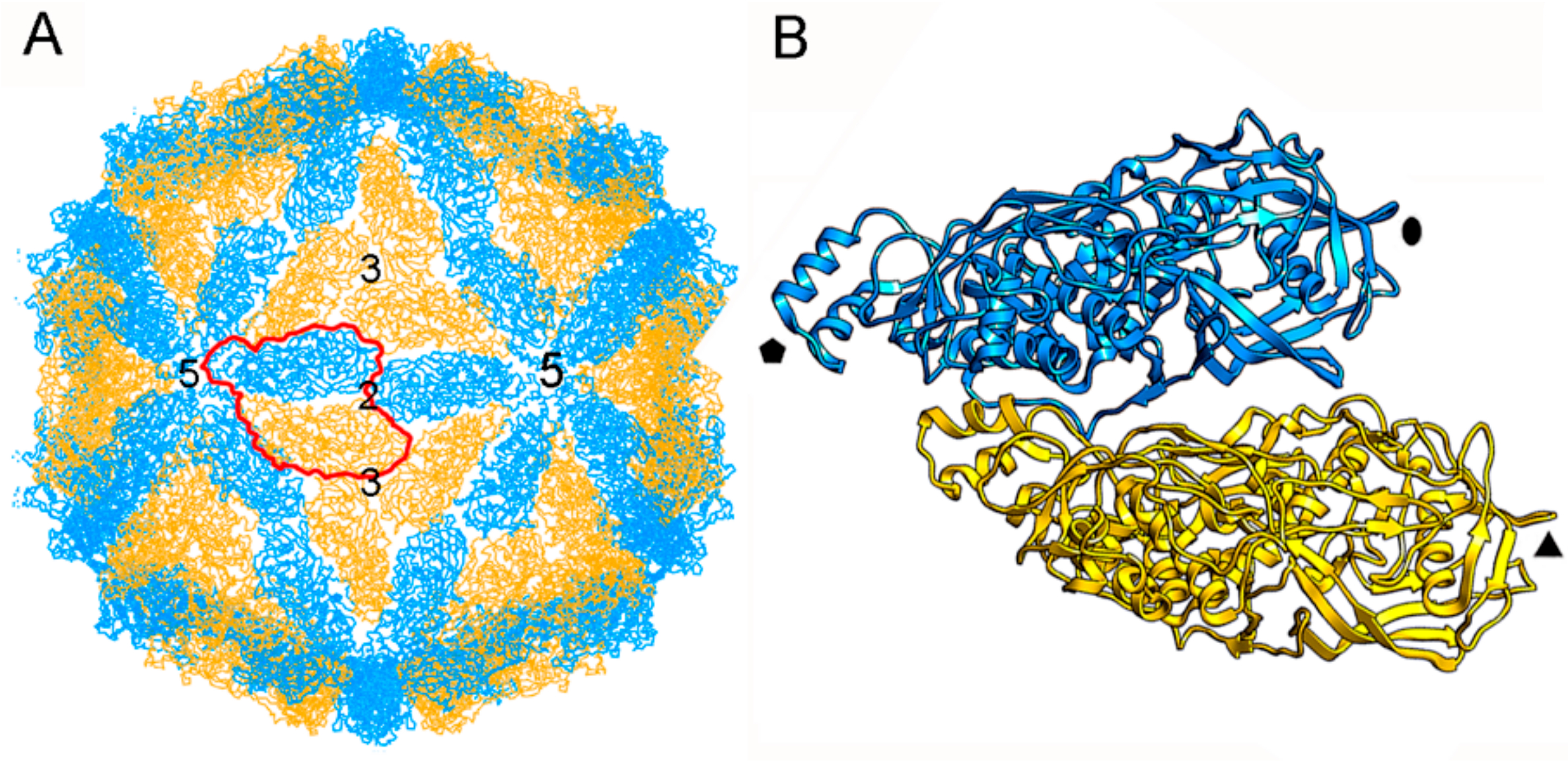
- Saccharomyces cerevisiae virus L-A capsid protein structure and homodimer of the gag capsid protei

Virus classification
- (unranked): Virus
- Realm: Riboviria
- Kingdom: Orthornavirae
- Phylum: Duplornaviricota
- Class: Chrymotiviricetes
- Order: Ghabrivirales
- Family: Orthototiviridae
- Genus: Totivirus

Synonyms
- Saccharomyces cerevisiae virus group

= Totivirus =

Genus of viruses

Totivirus is a genus of double-stranded RNA viruses in the family Orthototiviridae. Fungi serve as natural hosts. The name of the group derives from Latin toti which means undivided or whole. There are 32 species in this genus.

== Structure ==
Viruses in the genus Totivirus are non-enveloped, with icosahedral symmetry, and T=2 architecture. The diameter is around 40 nm.

== Genome ==
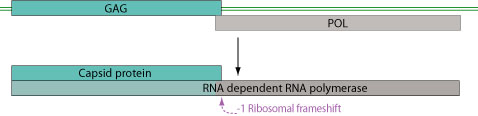
Genome of genus totivirus

Totiviruses have a genome of 4700–6700 nucleotides in length and only a single copy of the genome is present in the particle. The nucleic acid content of a totivirus capsid is one segment of linear double stranded RNA. The genome contains two large overlapping open reading frames (ORFs). These open reading frames (ORFs) code for a capsid protein (CP) and an RNA-dependent RNA polymerase (RdRp). The 5' end of the positive strand of the dsRNA genome has no cap and is very structured. Totiviruses contain a long 5' untranslated region (5' UTR) which functions as an internal ribosome entry site (IRES). Totiviruses can have satellite RNAs encoding a toxin.

== Life cycle ==
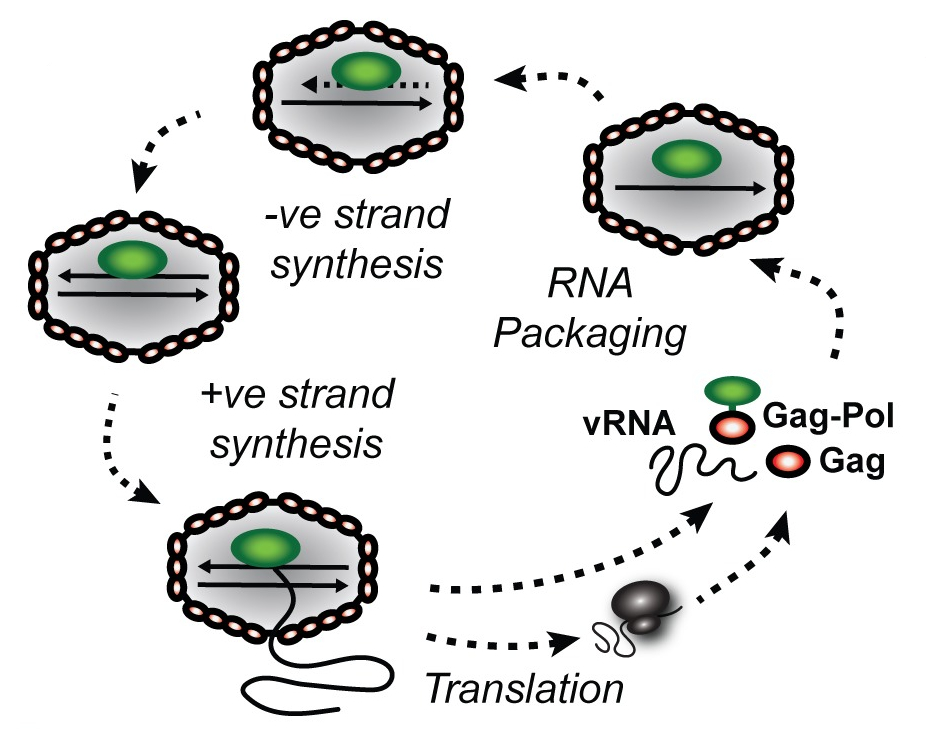
Life cycle of helper virus Saccharomyces cerevisiae virus L-A

Viral replication is cytoplasmic. Entry into the host cell is achieved by virus remains intracellular. Replication follows the double-stranded RNA virus replication model. Double-stranded RNA virus transcription is the method of transcription. Translation takes place by -1 ribosomal frameshifting. The virus exits the host cell by cell-to-cell movement. Fungi Saccharomyces cerevisiae and smut serve as the natural host. The virus is transmitted during cell division, sporogenesis, and cell fusion.

== Taxonomy ==
The genus Totivirus contains the following species:

- Totivirus go
- Totivirus hachi
- Totivirus ichi (Saccharomyces cerevisiae virus L-A)
- Totivirus jyu
- Totivirus jyugo
- Totivirus jyuhachi
- Totivirus jyuichi
- Totivirus jyukyu
- Totivirus jyuni
- Totivirus jyuroku
- Totivirus jyusani
- Totivirus jyushi
- Totivirus jyushichi
- Totivirus kyu
- Totivirus ni
- Totivirus nijyu
- Totivirus nijyugo
- Totivirus nijyuhachi
- Totivirus nijyuichi
- Totivirus nijyukyu
- Totivirus nijyuni
- Totivirus nijyuroku
- Totivirus nijyusani
- Totivirus nijyushi
- Totivirus nijyushichi
- Totivirus roku
- Totivirus sani
- Totivirus sanjyu
- Totivirus sanjyuichi
- Totivirus sanjyuni
- Totivirus shi
- Totivirus shichi
