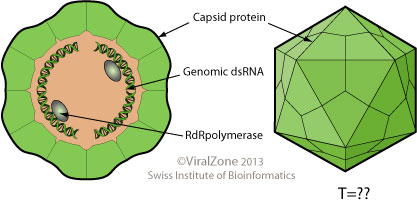

Virus classification
- (unranked): Virus
- Realm: Riboviria
- Kingdom: Orthornavirae
- Phylum: Duplornaviricota
- Class: Chrymotiviricetes
- Order: Ghabrivirales
- Family: Megabirnaviridae
- Genus: Megabirnavirus

= Megabirnaviridae =

Megabirnavirus

Family of viruses

Megabirnaviridae is a family of double-stranded RNA viruses with one genus Megabirnavirus which infects fungi. The group name derives from member's bipartite dsRNA genome and mega that is greater genome size (16 kbp), than families Birnaviridae (6 kbp) and Picobirnaviridae (4 kbp). The genus has five species. Diseases associated with this family include: reduced host virulence.

== Structure ==
Viruses in the family Megabirnaviridae are non-enveloped, with icosahedral geometries, and T=1 symmetry. The diameter is around 50 nm.

== Genome ==
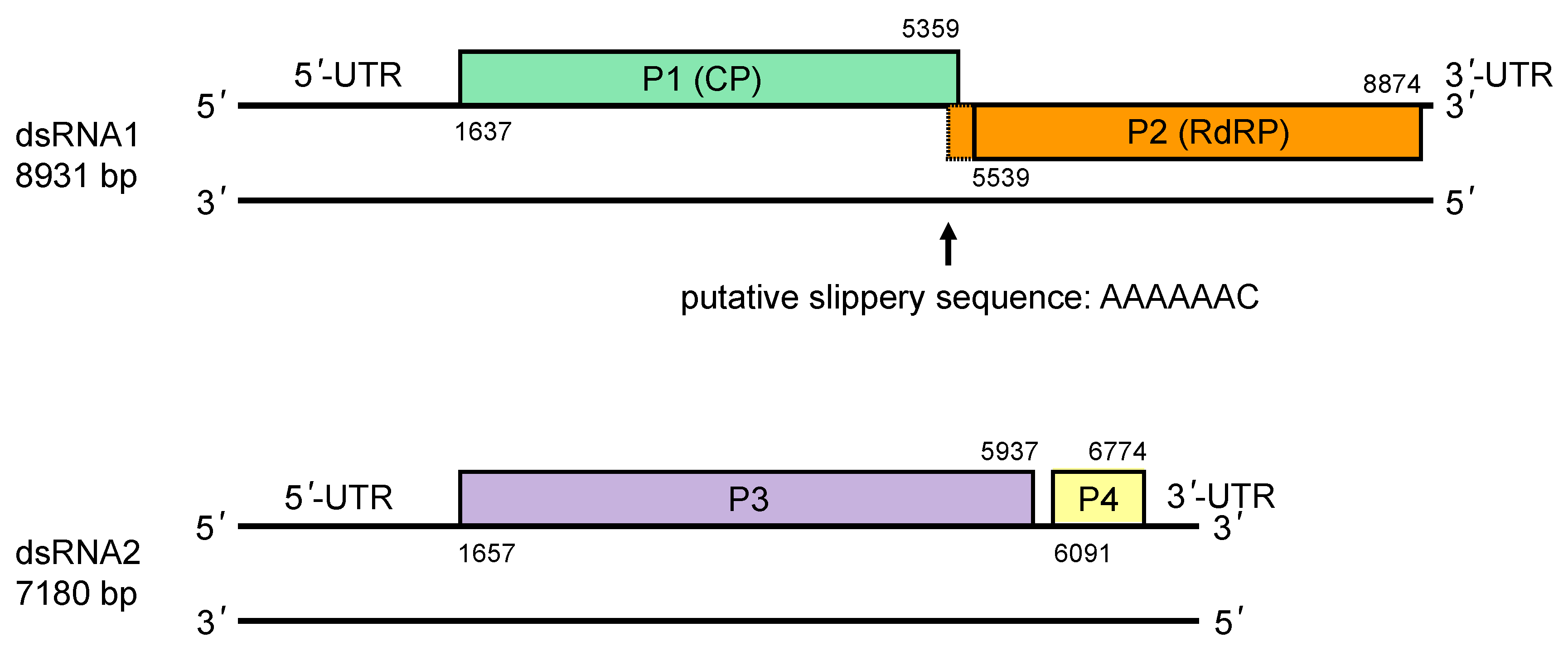
Genome organization of Rosellinia necatrix megabirnavirus 1

The genome is composed of two double-stranded RNA segments of 7.2–8.9 kbp each and of a total length of 16.1 kbp. The genome codes for four proteins.

== Life cycle ==
Viral replication is cytoplasmic. Entry into the host cell is achieved by penetration into the host cell. Replication follows the double-stranded RNA virus replication model. Double-stranded RNA virus transcription is the method of transcription. The virus exits the host cell by cell to cell movement. Fungi serve as the natural host. Transmission routes are parental and sexual.

Genus	Host details	Tissue tropism	Entry details	Release details	Replication site	Assembly site	Transmission
Megabirnavirus	Fungi	None	Cytoplasmic exchange; hyphal anastomosis	Cytoplasmic exchange; hyphal anastomosis	Cytoplasm	Cytoplasm	Cytoplasmic exchange; hyphal anastomosis

== Taxonomy ==
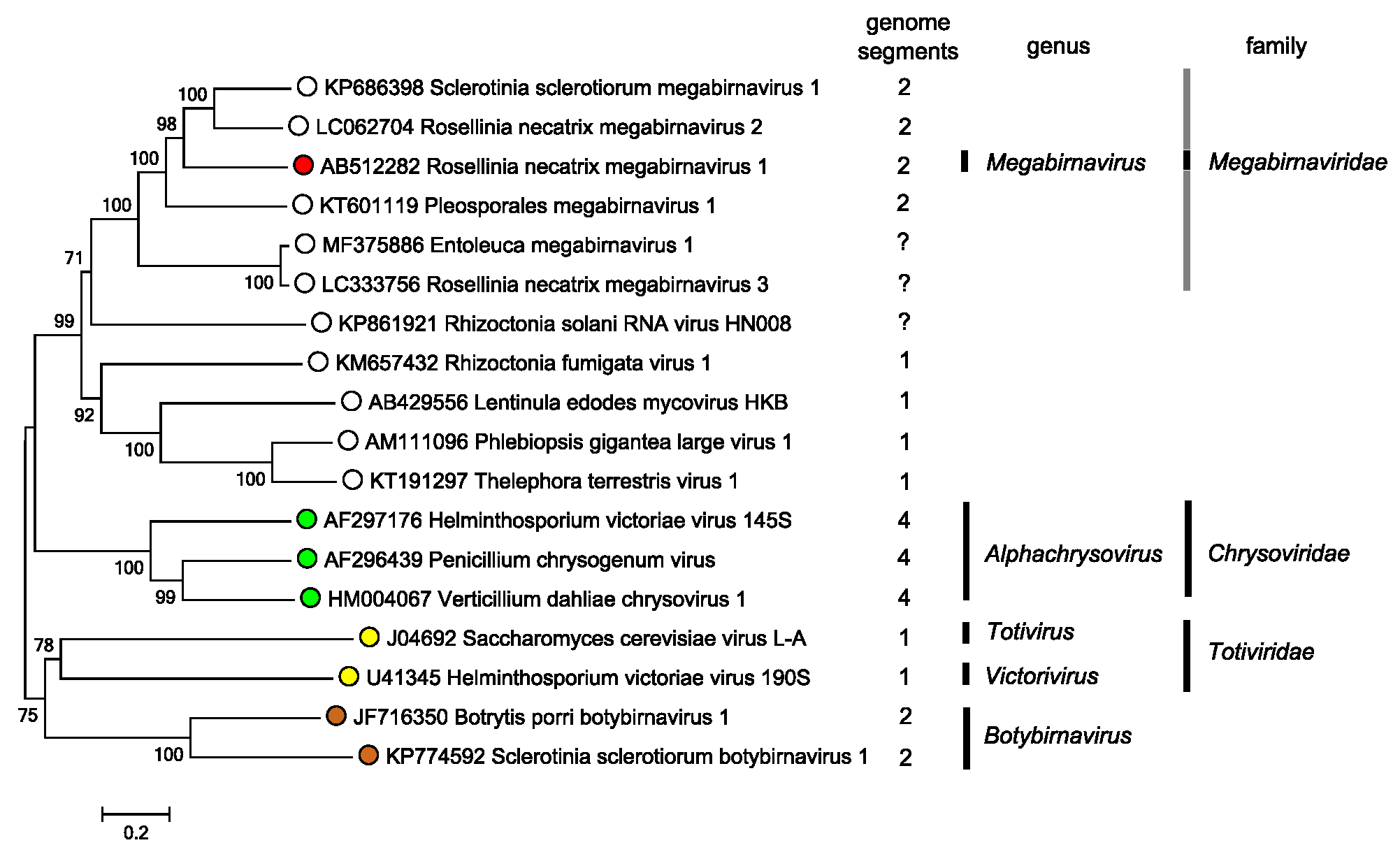
Phylogenetic tree of family Megabirnaviridae

The family Megabirnaviridae has one genus, Megabirnavirus, which has the following species:

- Megabirnavirus go
- Megabirnavirus ichi (Rosellinia necatrix megabirnavirus 1)
- Megabirnavirus ni
- Megabirnavirus sani
- Megabirnavirus shi
