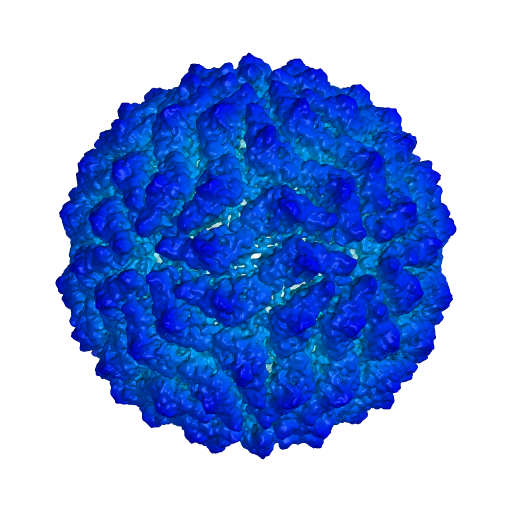
- Cryo-EM reconstruction of Giardia lamblia virus (GLV) particle color based on distance from center

Virus classification
- (unranked): Virus
- Realm: Riboviria
- Kingdom: Orthornavirae
- Phylum: Duplornaviricota
- Class: Chrymotiviricetes
- Order: Ghabrivirales
- Family: Giardiaviridae
- Genus: Giardiavirus
- Species: Giardiavirus ichi

= Giardiavirus =

Genus of viruses

Giardiavirus is a genus of viruses, in the family Giardiaviridae. Protozoa serve as natural hosts. There is only one species in this genus: Giardiavirus ichi.

== Structure ==
Viruses in Giardiavirus are non-enveloped, with icosahedral geometries, and T=2 symmetry. The diameter is around 36 nm. Genomes are linear, around 6277kb in length. The genome has 2 open reading frames.

Genus	Structure	Symmetry	Capsid	Genomic arrangement	Genomic segmentation
Giardiavirus	Icosahedral	T=2	Non-enveloped	Linear	Monopartite

== Life cycle ==
Viral replication is cytoplasmic. Entry into the host cell is achieved by attachment to host receptors, which mediates endocytosis. Replication follows the double-stranded RNA virus replication model. Double-stranded rna virus transcription is the method of transcription. Translation takes place by -1 ribosomal frameshifting, and viral initiation. Protozoa serve as the natural host.

Genus	Host details	Tissue tropism	Entry details	Release details	Replication site	Assembly site	Transmission
Giardiavirus	Protozoa	None	Cell receptor endocytosis	Exocytosis	Cytoplasm	Cytoplasm	Passive diffusion

== Taxonomy ==
The genus Giardiavirus has one species:

- Giardiavirus ichi
