= Yeast Promoter Atlas =

YPA

Content
- Description: Yeast Promoter Atlas
- Organisms: Saccharomyces cerevisiae

Contact
- Research center: National Cheng Kung University
- Laboratory: Department of Electrical Engineering
- Authors: Darby Tien-Hao Chang
- Primary citation: Chang & al. (2011)
- Release date: 2010

Access
- Website: http://ypa.ee.ncku.edu.tw/

The Yeast Promoter Atlas (YPA) is a repository of promoter features in Saccharomyces cerevisiae.
