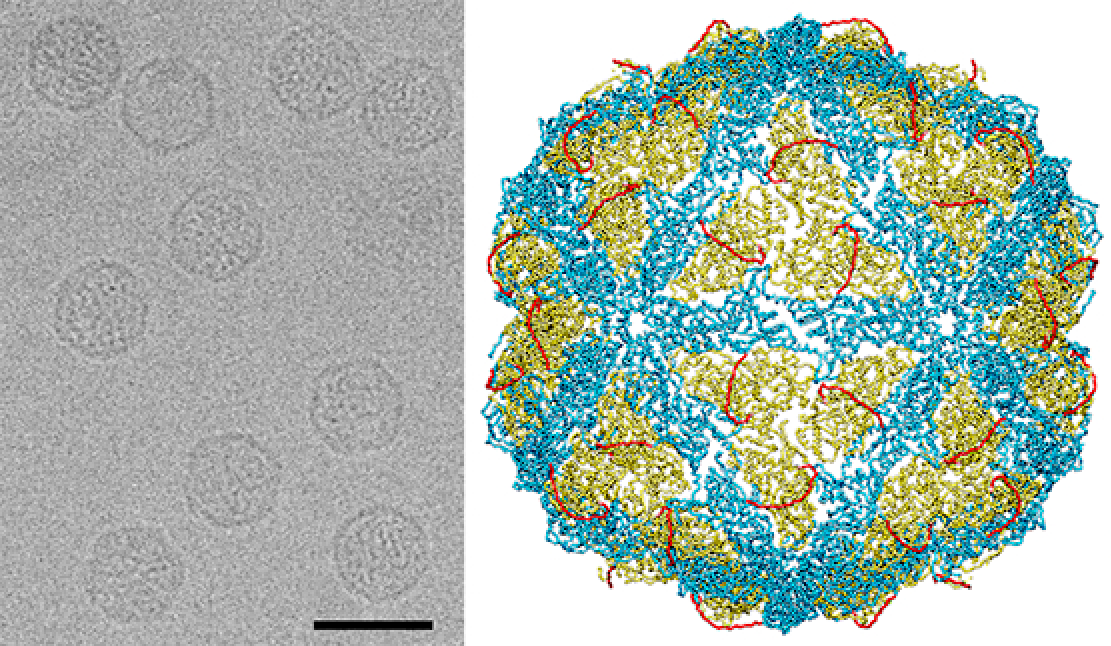
- Cryo-EM reconstruction of Penicillium chrysogenum virus (PcV) virions

Virus classification
- (unranked): Virus
- Realm: Riboviria
- Kingdom: Orthornavirae
- Phylum: Duplornaviricota
- Class: Chrymotiviricetes
- Order: Ghabrivirales
- Family: Chrysoviridae

= Chrysoviridae =

Family of viruses

Chrysoviridae is a family of double-stranded RNA viruses. Members of the family are called chrysoviruses.

== Virology ==
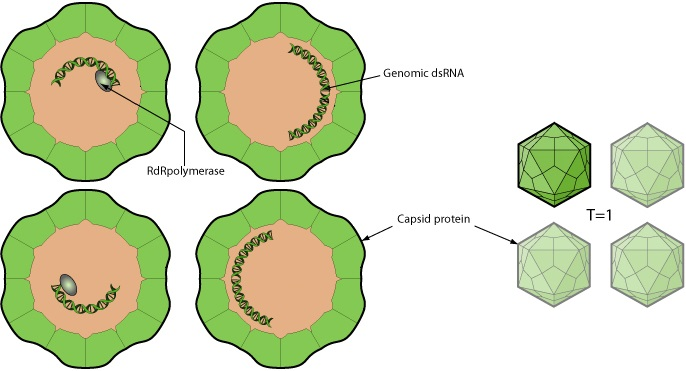
A set of Crysoviridae virions, each containing one genome segment. Modified after SIB ViralZone.

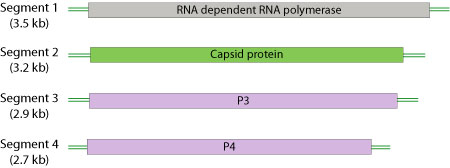
Genome map of family Chrysoviridae

The capsid is about 35-40 nm in diameter. The genome has four segments (tetrapartite). These segments are separately encapsulated.

== Taxonomy ==
The following genera are recognized:

- Alphachrysovirus
- Betachrysovirus
