= Berkeley body =

Organelle unique to Saccharomyces cerevisiae

Berkeley bodies are organelles unique to the yeast cell Saccharomyces cerevisiae, with a secretory mutation in the genes sec7 and sec14. The function of the organelle lies in the CTV (cytoplasm to vacuole targeting) pathway, which is a transport pathway for certain vacuolar hydrolases to be degenerated. The Berkeley body acts as the transport medium from the cytoplasm to the vacuole within this pathway. Studies have shown that Berkeley bodies share structural similarities with autophagosomes, which are involved in autophagy.

The organelle consists of two enclosed membranes forming an enclosed lumen, which contains cytoplasm. It is formed by vesicles budding off the Golgi apparatus or the endoplasmic reticulum. They were discovered in 1980 by Peter Novick and Randy Schekman, of the Department of Biochemistry, University of California, Berkeley.
