= Yeastract =

Database

YEASTRACT

Content
- Description: Transcriptional Regulatory Associations in Saccharomyces cerevisiae
- Organisms: Saccharomyces cerevisiae

Contact
- Authors: http://yeastract.com/credits.php
- Primary citation: Teixeira & al. (2006)
- Release date: 2006

Access
- Website: http://www.yeastract.com

YEASTRACT (Yeast Search for Transcriptional Regulators And Consensus Tracking) is a curated repository of more than 48000 regulatory associations between transcription factors (TF) and target genes in Saccharomyces cerevisiae, based on more than 1200 bibliographic references. It also includes the description of about 300 specific DNA binding sites for more than a hundred characterized TFs. Further information about each Yeast gene has been extracted from the Saccharomyces Genome Database (SGD). For each gene the associated Gene Ontology (GO) terms and their hierarchy in GO was obtained from the GO consortium. Currently, YEASTRACT maintains more than 7100 terms from GO. The nucleotide sequences of the promoter and coding regions for Yeast genes were obtained from Regulatory Sequence Analysis Tools (RSAT). All the information in YEASTRACT is updated regularly to match the latest data from SGD, GO consortium, RSA Tools and recent literature on yeast regulatory networks.

YEASTRACT includes DISCOVERER, a set of tools that can be used to identify complex motifs found to be over-represented in the promoter regions of co-regulated genes. DISCOVERER is based on the MUSA algorithm. These algorithms take as input a list of genes and identify over-represented motifs, which can then be compared with transcription factor binding sites described in the YEASTRACT database.

Facilities are also provided to enable the exploitation of the gathered data when solving a number of biological questions, as exemplified in the Tutorial. YEASTRACT allows the identification of documented or potential transcription regulators of a given gene and of documented or potential regulons for each transcription factor. It also renders possible the comparison between DNA motifs and the transcription factor binding sites described in the literature. The system also provides a useful mechanism for grouping a list of genes (for instance a set of genes with similar expression profiles as revealed by microarray analysis) based on their regulatory associations with known transcription factors.

YEASTRACT provides a set of queries to search and retrieve important biological information from the gathered data and to predict transcription regulation networks in yeast from data emerging from gene-by-gene analysis or global approaches.

== See also ==
- Transcription factors
