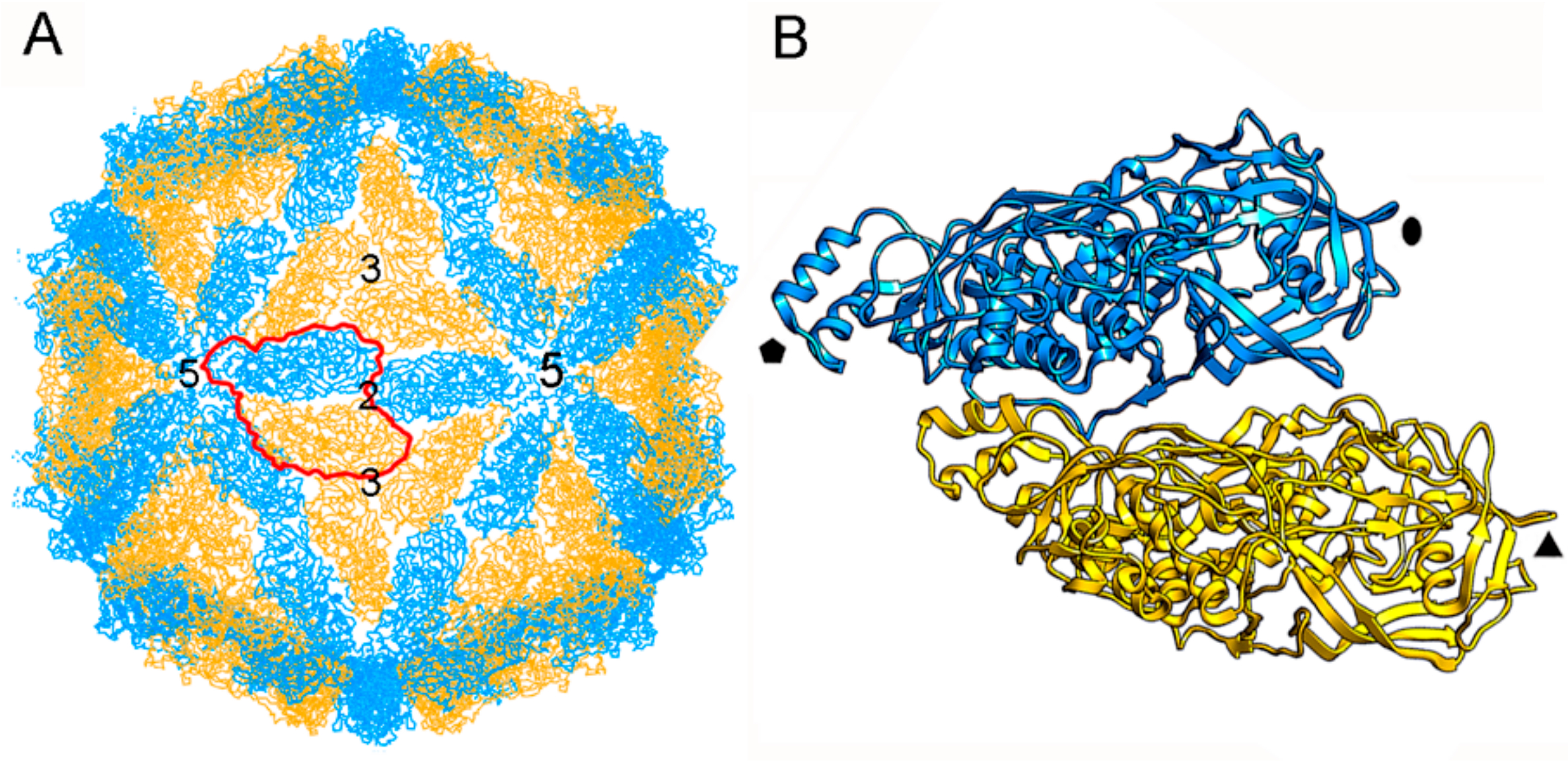
- ScV-L-A capsid protein structure and homodimer of the gag capsid protein

Virus classification
- (unranked): Virus
- Realm: Riboviria
- Kingdom: Orthornavirae
- Phylum: Duplornaviricota
- Class: Chrymotiviricetes
- Order: Ghabrivirales
- Family: Orthototiviridae
- Genus: Totivirus
- Species: Totivirus ichi

Synonyms
- L-A helper virus; Saccharomyces cerevisiae virus L-A; Saccharomyces cerevisiae virus LA; Saccharomyces cerevisiae virus ScV1

= Saccharomyces cerevisiae virus L-A =

L-A helper virus

Species of virus

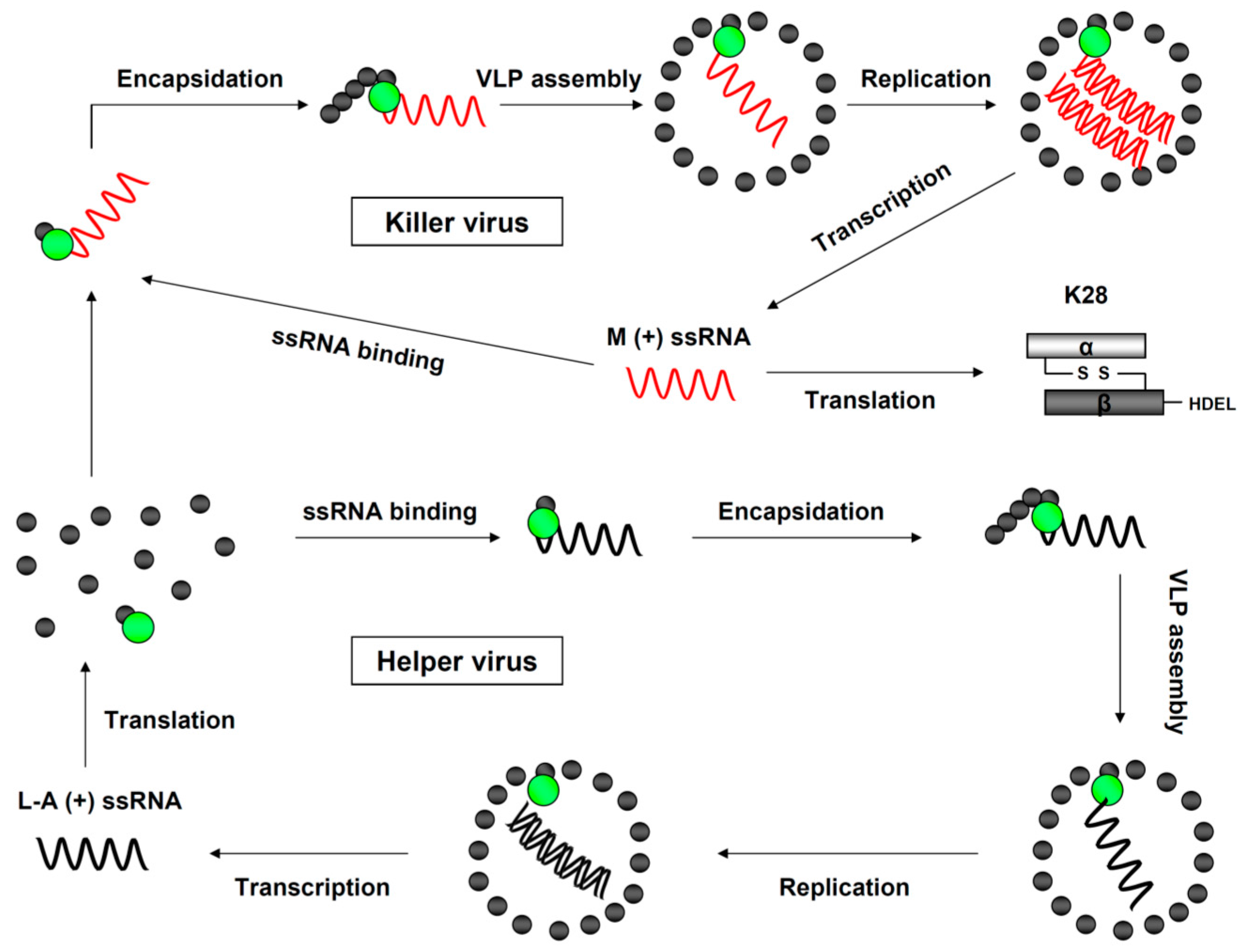
Replication cycle of L-A helper, shown at bottom, and M28 (K28) killer viruses in S. cerevisiae.

Saccharomyces cerevisiae virus L-A, also called L-A helper virus, is a member of the Totivirus genus of viruses found primarily in Saccharomyces cerevisiae. Its discovery in the 1970s was the main starting point of research on yeast virology. It is a ~4.6 kb double-stranded RNA virus with no extracellular phase and so is inherited through vertical cytoplasmic transmission.

Additionally, in many strains of the yeast, it is found along with another virus called the M virus (or "M dsRNA", "Saccharomyces cerevisiae killer virus"), known to encode the killer toxin in many S. cerevisiae strains which confers the ability to kill neighboring sensitive cells that do not harbor the virus. It is indeed for this reason the virus is referred to as a helper virus, due to the M genome's dependence on it for its own survival and replication. (More recently, the M dsRNA is described as a satellite RNA.) A yeast lineage with a M/killer virus is known as a "killer strain".

There are numerous apparently unrelated M dsRNAs that use L-A, their only similarity being their genome organization. The family of Totiviridae in general helps M-type dsRNAs in a wide variety of yeasts.
