= Biosprint =

Feed additives

- Manufacturer: Prosol S.p.A.
- Available: worldwide
- Website: www.biosprint.bio
- Notes; Feed additive, Zootechnical additive

Biosprint is a microbiological feed additive produced and worldwide distributed by the Italian biotech company Prosol S.p.A. This zoo-technical additive contains cells of the yeast Saccharomyces cerevisiae, selected under the unique code MUCL™ 39885 and deposited in the Belgian collections of micro-organisms under the Mycothèque de l’Université Catholique de Louvain. Biosprint has gained the EU authorization as feed additive for beef cattle, piglets, sows, dairy cows, and horses. According to several tests, the influence of Biosprint on the diet consists of the improvement of the digestive efficiency and of the better assimilation of nutrients.

== Application ==
Biosprint is authorised for use in feed formulations for cats, demonstrating efficacy in enhancing nutrient digestibility and promoting gut health. The additive has also been shown to support growth and feed efficiency in cattle for fattening, contributing to improved performance outcomes. For minor ruminant species, Biosprint has been validated for enhancing both meat and milk production, providing economic benefits in small-scale farming contexts. Its application in weaned piglets has resulted in improved gut stability and resilience against digestive disturbances. Biosprint is also used in feed for horses, where it supports fibre digestibility and helps maintain healthy intestinal microbiota balance.
