= Ras2 =

Ras2 is a Saccharomyces cerevisiae guanine nucleotide-binding protein (encoded by the RAS2 gene) which becomes activated by binding GTP when glucose is present in the environment. It affects growth regulation and starvation response.

== Modifications ==
Ras2 becomes post-translationally modified in two ways, both being necessary for its activity: Upon activation, palmitoylation at its C terminus takes place and causes attachment from the cytoplasm to the plasma membrane. Farnesylation allows for efficient interaction with the downstream adenylate cyclase Cyr1p. In wild-type yeast deactivated Ras2 is transported to and degraded in the vacuole, a process for which Whi2 is essential. Disturbing this process leads to Ras2 accumulation at the mitochondrial membrane, a behavior that was not observed before.

== Ras2-cAMP-PKA pathway ==
When activating the adenylate cyclase, Ras2 indirectly raises the cellular cAMP levels, thereby activating the PKA, by which in turn it is downregulated.

== Downstream effects ==
In a probably indirect manner via the above PKA regulation, Ras2 has a suppressing effect on the yeast general stress response transcription factor Msn2.

Active Ras2 was also found in the nucleus, the reason is currently unknown.
