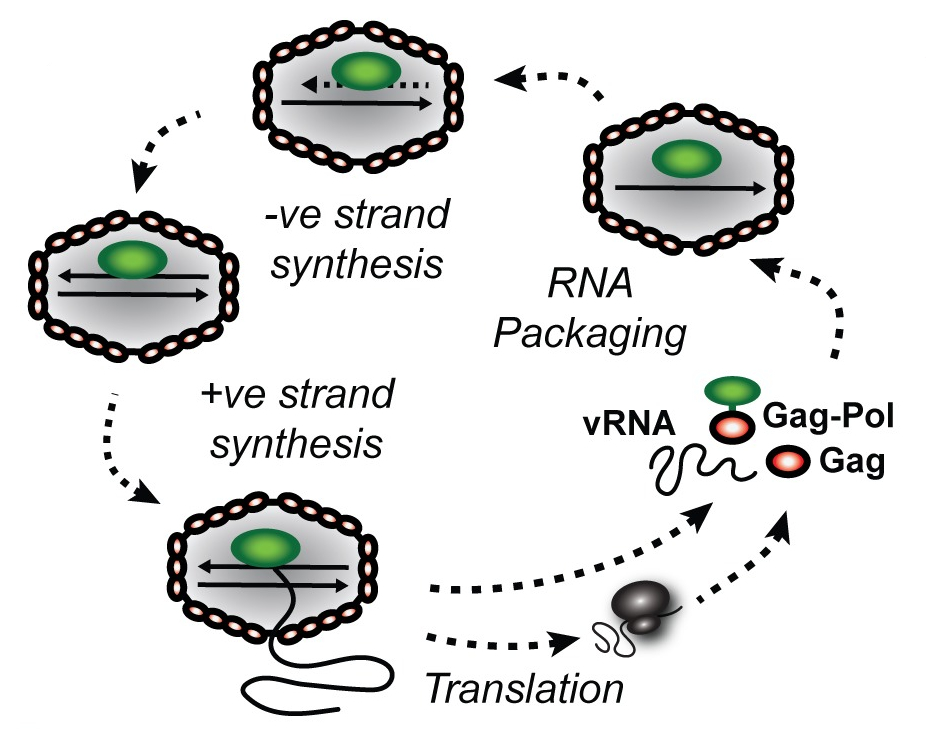
- Life cycle of S. cerevisiae virus L-A

Virus classification
- (unranked): Virus
- Realm: Riboviria
- Kingdom: Orthornavirae
- Phylum: Duplornaviricota
- Class: Chrymotiviricetes
- Order: Ghabrivirales

= Ghabrivirales =

Order of viruses

Ghabrivirales is an order of double-stranded RNA viruses. It is the only order in the class Chrysmotiviricetes. The name of the class is a portmanteau of member families: chrysoviridae, megabirnaviridae, and totiviridae; and -viricetes which is the suffix for a virus class. The name of the order derives from Said Ghabrial, a pioneering researcher who studied viruses in this order, and -virales which is the suffix for a virus order.

== Taxonomy ==
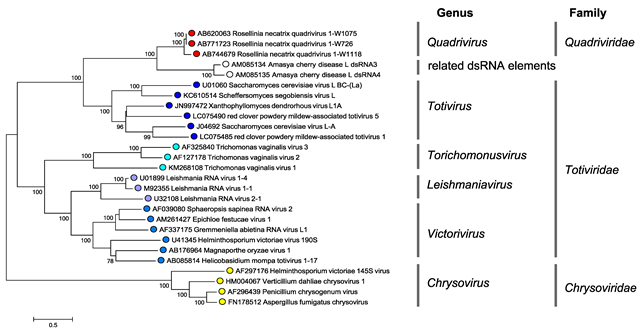
Phylogenetic tree of quadriviruses, chrysoviruses and some totiviruses

The order contains three suborders and 19 families, listed hereafter (-virineae denotes suborders, and -viridae denotes families):

- Alphatotivirineae
  - Botybirnaviridae
  - Chrysoviridae
  - Fusagraviridae
  - Megabirnaviridae
  - Monocitiviridae
  - Orthototiviridae
  - Phlegiviridae
  - Pseudototiviridae
  - Quadriviridae
  - Spiciviridae
- Betatotivirineae
  - Artiviridae
  - Giardiaviridae
  - Inseviridae
  - Lebotiviridae
  - Megatotiviridae
  - Ootiviridae
  - Pistolviridae
  - Yadonushiviridae
- Gammatotivirineae
  - Alternaviridae
