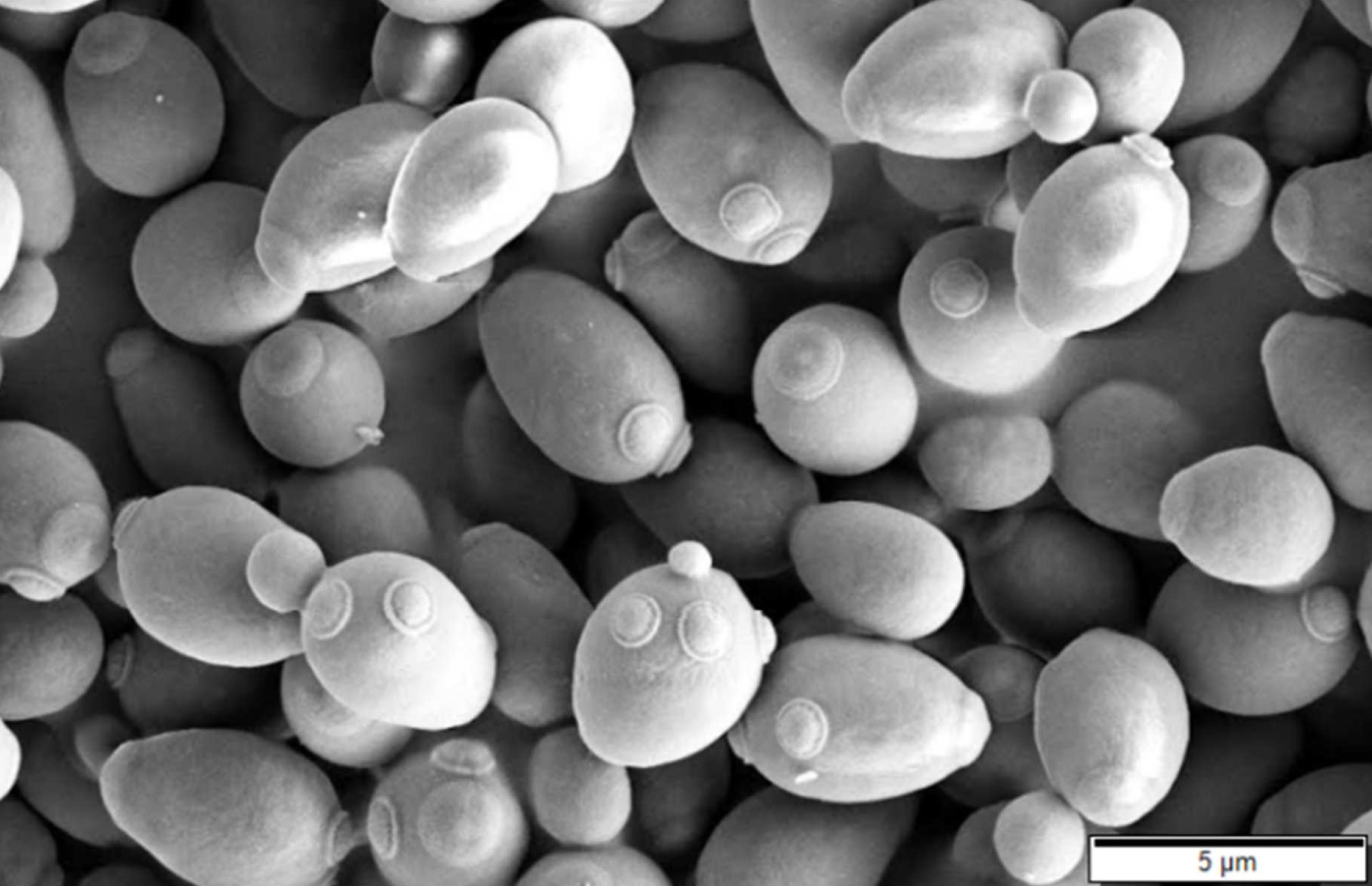
- S. cerevisiae, electron micrograph

Scientific classification
- Kingdom: Fungi
- Division: Ascomycota
- Subdivision: Saccharomycotina
- Class: Saccharomycetes
- Order: Saccharomycetales
- Family: Saccharomycetaceae
- Genus: Saccharomyces
- Species: S. cerevisiae

Binomial name
- Saccharomyces cerevisiae Meyen ex E.C. Hansen

= Saccharomyces cerevisiae =

Species of yeast

Saccharomyces cerevisiae (/ˌsɛrəˈvɪsi.iː/), also called brewer's yeast or baker's yeast, is a species of yeast (single-celled fungal microorganisms). The species has been instrumental in winemaking, baking, and brewing since ancient times. It is believed to have been originally isolated from the skin of grapes. (Note: The yeast can be seen as a component of the thin white film on the skins of some dark-colored fruits such as plums; it exists among the waxes of the cuticle.) It is one of the most intensively studied eukaryotic model organisms in molecular and cell biology, much like Escherichia coli as the model bacterium. It is the microorganism which causes many common types of fermentation. S. cerevisiae cells are round to ovoid, 5–10 μm in diameter. It reproduces by budding.

Many proteins important in human biology were first discovered by studying their homologs in yeast; these proteins include cell cycle proteins, signaling proteins, and protein-processing enzymes. S. cerevisiae is currently the only yeast cell known to have Berkeley bodies present, which are involved in particular secretory pathways. Antibodies against S. cerevisiae are found in 60–70% of patients with Crohn's disease and 10–15% of patients with ulcerative colitis, and may be useful as part of a panel of serological markers in differentiating between inflammatory bowel diseases (e.g. between ulcerative colitis and Crohn's disease), their localization, and severity.

== Etymology ==
"Saccharomyces" derives from Latinized Greek and means "sugar-mold" or "sugar-fungus", with saccharon (σάκχαρον) being the combining form of 'sugar' and myces (μύκης) being 'fungus'. Cerevisiae comes from Latin and means 'of beer'. Other names for the organism are:

- Brewer's yeast, though other species are also used in brewing
- Baker's yeast, though other species are also used in baking
- Ale yeast
- Top-fermenting yeast
- Ragi yeast, in connection to making tapai
- Budding yeast

This species is also the main source of nutritional yeast and yeast extract.

== History ==
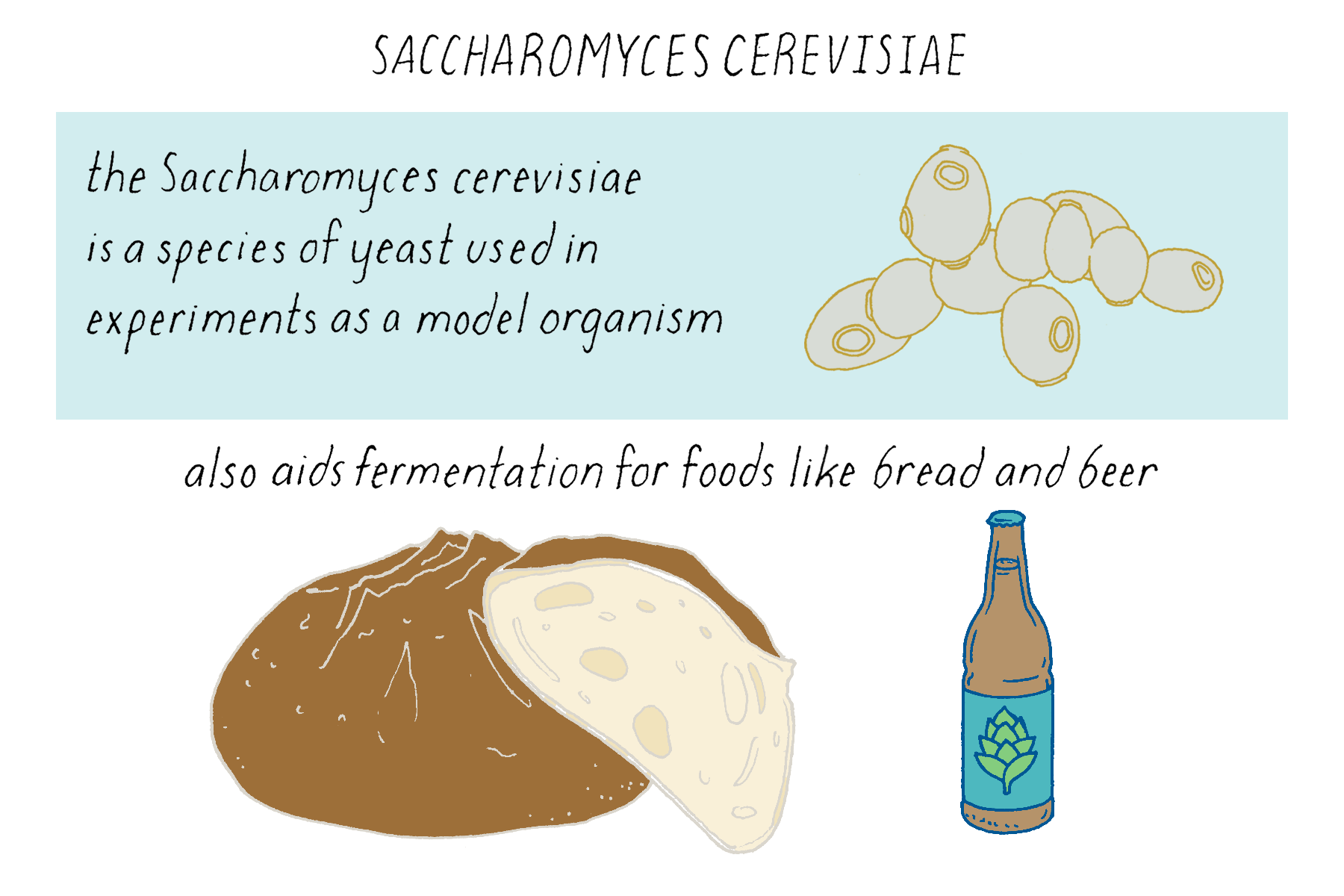
Saccharomyces cerevisiae is a species of yeast used to make bread, wine, and beer since ancient times. In the laboratory, it is often used to study basic biological processes that also occur in multicellular organisms.

In antiquity, pure yeasts were unavailable due to a lack of understanding of microbiology necessary to produce them. Instead, mixtures of wild bacteria (especially Lactobacillus) and yeasts were used for brewing and leavening, resulting in acidic goods. However, empirical testing by beer makers around the 15th century led to the discovery that first boiling a wort containing hops gave a non acidic beverage. The reason for this was unknown at the time, but boiling killed unwanted bacteria, and the hops contain natural chemicals that suppressed the regrowth of acid-making bacteria while the yeast flourished.

Thus in the 19th century, bread bakers obtained their yeast from beer brewers, and this led to sweet-fermented breads such as the Imperial "Kaisersemmel" roll, which in general lacked the sourness created by the acidification typical of Lactobacillus. However, many beer brewers slowly switched from top-fermenting (S. cerevisiae) to bottom-fermenting (S. pastorianus) yeast. The Vienna Process was developed in 1846. While the innovation is often popularly credited for using steam in baking ovens, leading to a different crust characteristic, it is notable for including procedures for high milling of grains (see Vienna grits), cracking them incrementally instead of mashing them with one pass; as well as better processes for growing and harvesting top-fermenting yeasts, known as press-yeast.

Refinements in microbiology following the work of Louis Pasteur led to more advanced methods of culturing pure strains. In 1879, Great Britain introduced specialized growing vats for the production of S. cerevisiae, and in the United States around the turn of the 20th century centrifuges were used for concentrating the yeast, turning yeast production into a major industrial process which simplified its distribution, reduced unit costs, and contributed to the commercialization and commoditization of bread and beer. Fresh "cake yeast" became the standard leaven for bread bakers in much of the Western world during the early 20th century.

During World War II, Fleischmann's developed a granulated active dry yeast for the United States armed forces, which did not require refrigeration and had a longer shelf-life and better temperature tolerance than fresh yeast; it is still the standard yeast for US military recipes. The company created yeast that would rise twice as fast, cutting down on baking time. Lesaffre would later create instant yeast in the 1970s, which has gained considerable use and market share at the expense of both fresh and dry yeast in their various applications.

== Biology ==
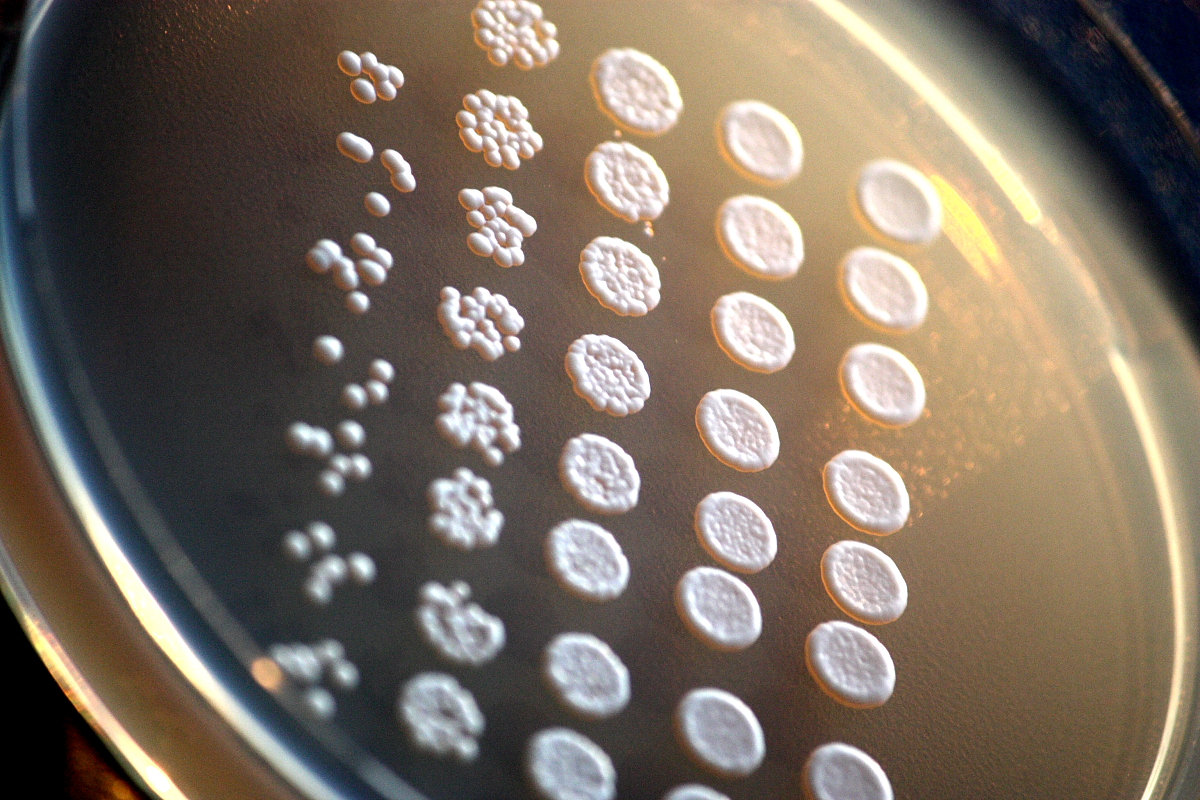
Yeast colonies on an agar plate.

=== Ecology ===
In nature, yeast cells are found primarily on ripe fruits such as grapes (before maturation, grapes are almost free of yeasts). S. cerevisiae can also be found year-round in the bark of oak trees. Since S. cerevisiae is not airborne, it requires a vector to move.

Queens of social wasps overwintering as adults (Vespa crabro and Polistes spp.) can harbor yeast cells from autumn to spring and transmit them to their progeny. The intestine of Polistes dominula, a social wasp, hosts S. cerevisiae strains as well as S. cerevisiae × S. paradoxus hybrids. Stefanini et al. (2016) showed that the intestine of Polistes dominula favors the mating of S. cerevisiae strains, both among themselves and with S. paradoxus cells by providing environmental conditions prompting cell sporulation and spores germination.

The optimum temperature for growth of S. cerevisiae is 30–35 °C (86–95 °F).

=== Life cycle ===
Two forms of yeast cells can survive and grow: haploid and diploid. The haploid cells undergo a simple lifecycle of mitosis and growth and, under conditions of high stress, will, in general, die. This is the asexual form of the fungus. The diploid cells (the preferential 'form' of yeast) similarly undergo a simple lifecycle of mitosis and growth. The rate at which the mitotic cell cycle progresses often differs substantially between haploid and diploid cells. Under conditions of stress, diploid cells can undergo sporulation, entering meiosis and producing four haploid spores, which can subsequently mate. This is the sexual form of the fungus. Under optimal conditions, yeast cells can double their population every 100 minutes. However, growth rates vary enormously between strains and between environments. Mean replicative lifespan is about 26 cell divisions.

In the wild, recessive deleterious mutations accumulate during long periods of asexual reproduction of diploids, and are purged during selfing: this purging has been termed "genome renewal".

=== Nutritional requirements ===
All strains of S. cerevisiae can grow aerobically on glucose, maltose, and trehalose and fail to grow on lactose and cellobiose. However, growth on other sugars is variable. Galactose and fructose are shown to be two of the best fermenting sugars. The ability of yeasts to use different sugars can differ depending on whether they are grown aerobically or anaerobically. Some strains cannot grow anaerobically on sucrose and trehalose.

All strains can use ammonia and urea as the sole nitrogen source, but cannot use nitrate, since they lack the ability to reduce them to ammonium ions. They can also use most amino acids, small peptides, and nitrogen bases as nitrogen sources. Histidine, glycine, cystine, and lysine are, however, not readily used. S. cerevisiae does not excrete proteases, so extracellular protein cannot be metabolized.

Yeasts also have a requirement for phosphorus, which is assimilated as a dihydrogen phosphate ion, and sulfur, which can be assimilated as a sulfate ion or as organic sulfur compounds such as the amino acids methionine and cysteine. Some metals, like magnesium, iron, calcium, and zinc, are also required for good growth of the yeast.

Concerning organic requirements, most strains of S. cerevisiae require biotin. Indeed, a S. cerevisiae-based growth assay laid the foundation for the isolation, crystallization, and later structural determination of biotin. Most strains also require pantothenate for full growth. In general, S. cerevisiae is prototrophic for vitamins.

=== Mating ===
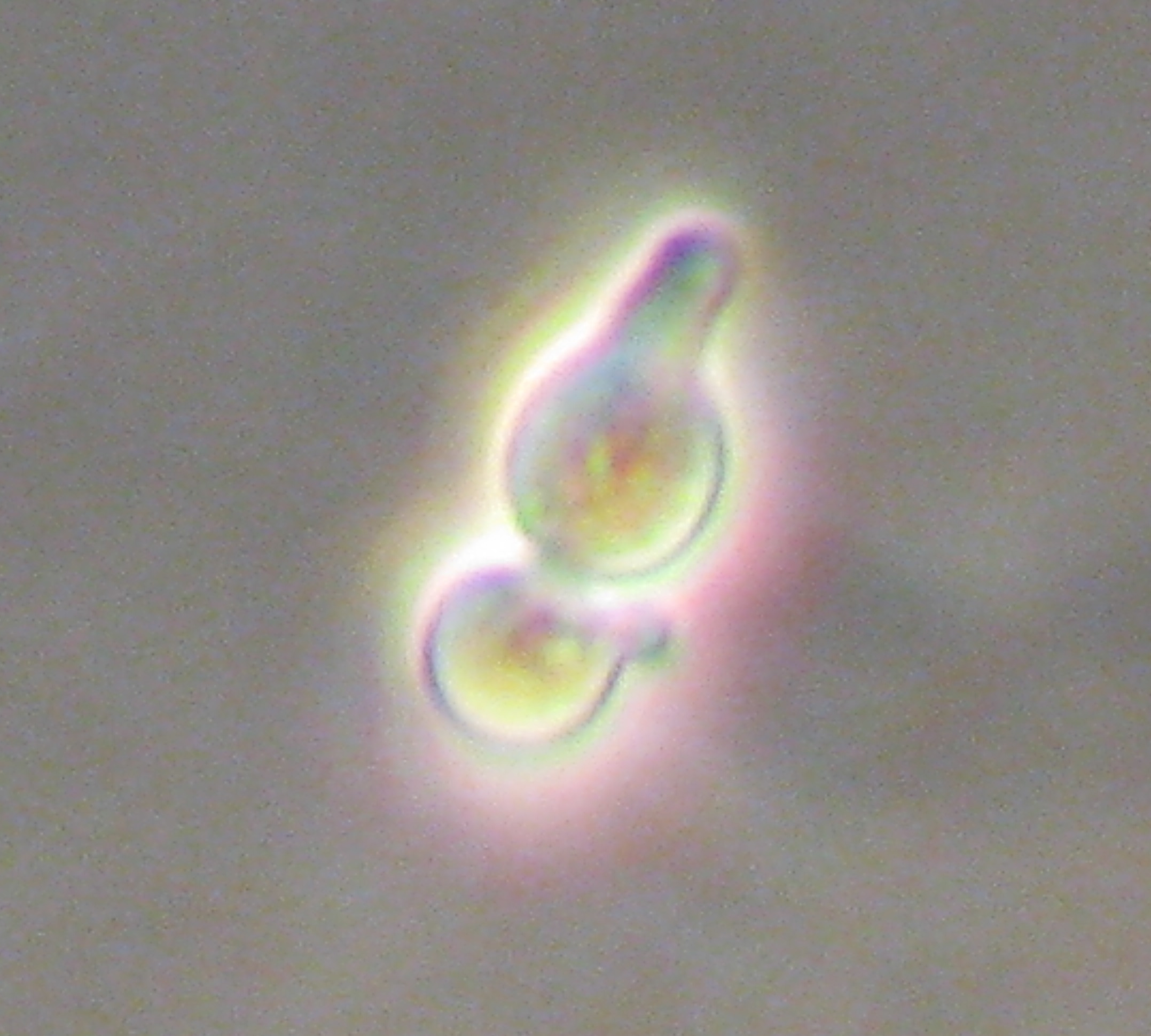
Saccharomyces cerevisiae mating type a with a cellular bulging called a shmoo in response to α-factor

Yeast has two mating types, a and α (alpha), which show primitive aspects of sex differentiation. As in many other eukaryotes, mating leads to genetic recombination, i.e. production of novel combinations of chromosomes. Two haploid yeast cells of opposite mating type can mate to form diploid cells that can either sporulate to form another generation of haploid cells or continue to exist as diploid cells. The yeast mating pathway is often used as a molecular model/tool for studying biological processes. The mating pathway can be exploited to better characterize gene expression, protein function, cell-cell communication, protein-protein interactions, growth/polarity, metabolism, and the general cell fusion process that is ubiquitous among many different organisms.

The mating pathway employs a G protein-coupled receptor, G protein, RGS protein, and three-tiered MAPK signaling cascade that is homologous to those found in humans. This feature has been exploited by biologists to investigate basic mechanisms of signal transduction and desensitization.

=== Cell cycle ===
Growth in yeast is synchronized with the growth of the bud, which reaches the size of the mature cell by the time it separates from the parent cell. In well nourished, rapidly growing yeast cultures, all the cells have buds, since bud formation occupies the whole cell cycle. Both mother and daughter cells can initiate bud formation before cell separation has occurred. In yeast cultures growing more slowly, cells lacking buds can be seen, and bud formation only occupies a part of the cell cycle.

==== Cytokinesis ====
Cytokinesis enables budding yeast Saccharomyces cerevisiae to divide into two daughter cells. S. cerevisiae forms a bud which can grow throughout its cell cycle and later leaves its mother cell when mitosis has completed.

S. cerevisiae is relevant to cell cycle studies because it divides asymmetrically by using a polarized cell to make two daughters with different fates and sizes. Similarly, stem cells use asymmetric division for self-renewal and differentiation.

===== Timing =====
For many cells, M phase does not happen until S phase is complete. However, for entry into mitosis in S. cerevisiae this is not true. Cytokinesis begins with the budding process in late G1 and is not completed until about halfway through the next cycle. The assembly of the spindle can happen before S phase has finished duplicating the chromosomes. Additionally, there is a lack of clearly defined G2 in between M and S. Thus, there is a lack of extensive regulation present in higher eukaryotes.

When the daughter emerges, the daughter is two-thirds the size of the mother. Throughout the process, the mother displays little to no change in size. The RAM pathway is activated in the daughter cell immediately after cytokinesis is complete. This pathway makes sure that the daughter has separated properly.

===== Actomyosin ring and primary septum formation =====
Two interdependent events drive cytokinesis in S. cerevisiae. The first event is contractile actomyosin ring (AMR) constriction and the second event is formation of the primary septum (PS), a chitinous cell wall structure that can only be formed during cytokinesis. The PS resembles in animals the process of extracellular matrix remodeling. When the AMR constricts, the PS begins to grow. Disrupting AMR misorients the PS, suggesting that both have a dependent role. Additionally, disrupting the PS also leads to disruptions in the AMR, suggesting both the actomyosin ring and primary septum have an interdependent relationship.

The AMR, which is attached to the cell membrane facing the cytosol, consists of actin and myosin II molecules that coordinate the cells to split. The ring is thought to play an important role in ingression of the plasma membrane as a contractile force.

Proper coordination and correct positional assembly of the contractile ring depends on septins, which is the precursor to the septum ring. These GTPases assemble complexes with other proteins. The septins form a ring at the site where the bud will be created during late G1. They help promote the formation of the actin-myosin ring, although this mechanism is unknown. It is suggested they help provide structural support for other necessary cytokinesis processes. After a bud emerges, the septin ring forms an hourglass. The septin hourglass and the myosin ring together are the beginning of the future division site.

The septin and AMR complex progress to form the primary septum consisting of glucans and other chitinous molecules sent by vesicles from the Golgi body. After AMR constriction is complete, two secondary septums are formed by glucans. How the AMR ring dissembles remains poorly unknown.

Microtubules do not play as significant a role in cytokinesis compared to the AMR and septum. Disruption of microtubules did not significantly impair polarized growth. Thus, the AMR and septum formation are the major drivers of cytokinesis.

===== Differences from fission yeast =====
- Budding yeast form a bud from the mother cell. This bud grows during the cell cycle and detaches; fission yeast divide by forming a cell wall
- Cytokinesis begins at G1 for budding yeast, while cytokinesis begins at G2 for fission yeast. Fission yeast "select" the midpoint, whereas budding yeast "select" a bud site
- During early anaphase the actomyosin ring and septum continues to develop in budding yeast, in fission yeast during metaphase-anaphase the actomyosin ring begins to develop

== In biological research ==
=== Model organism ===
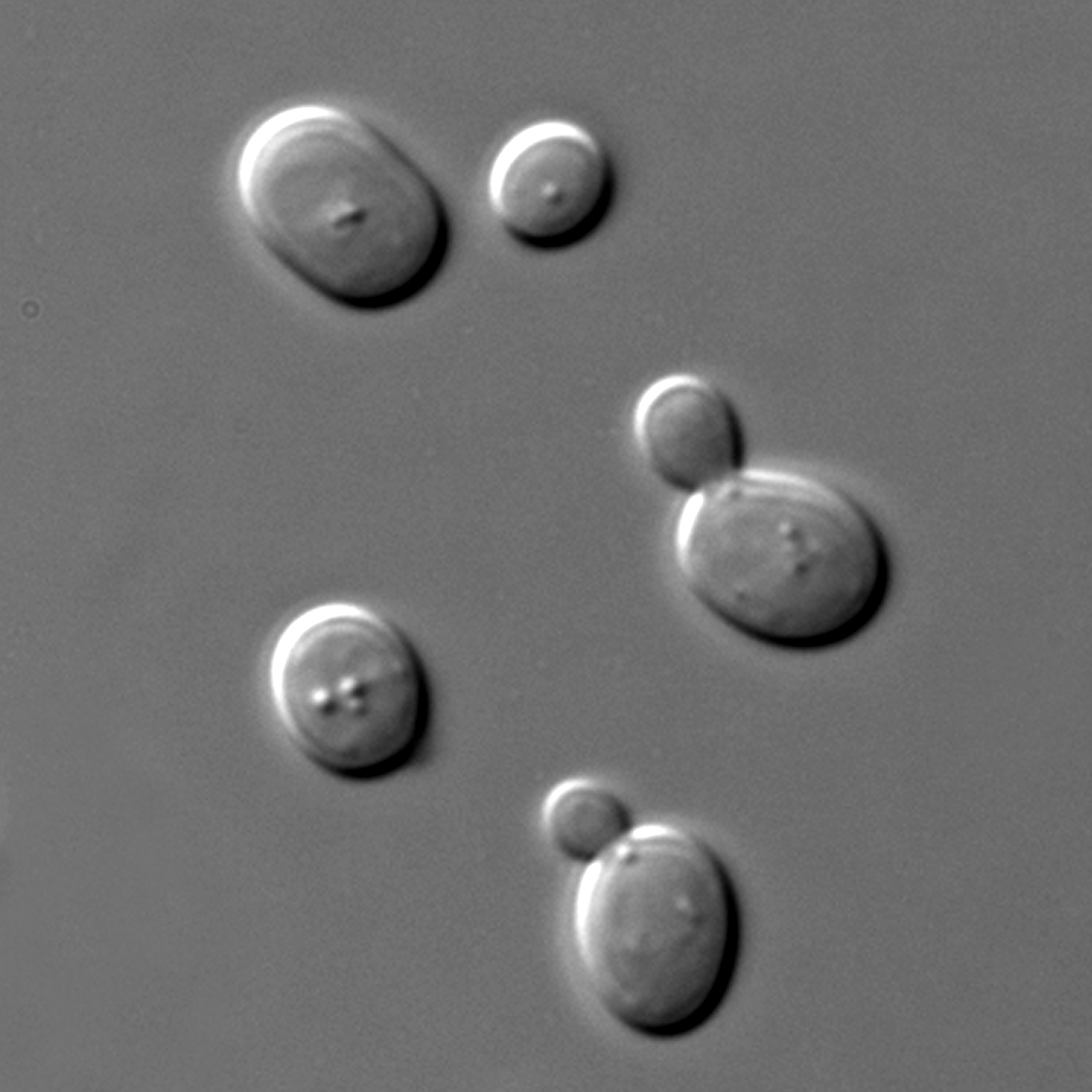
S. cerevisiae, differential interference contrast image

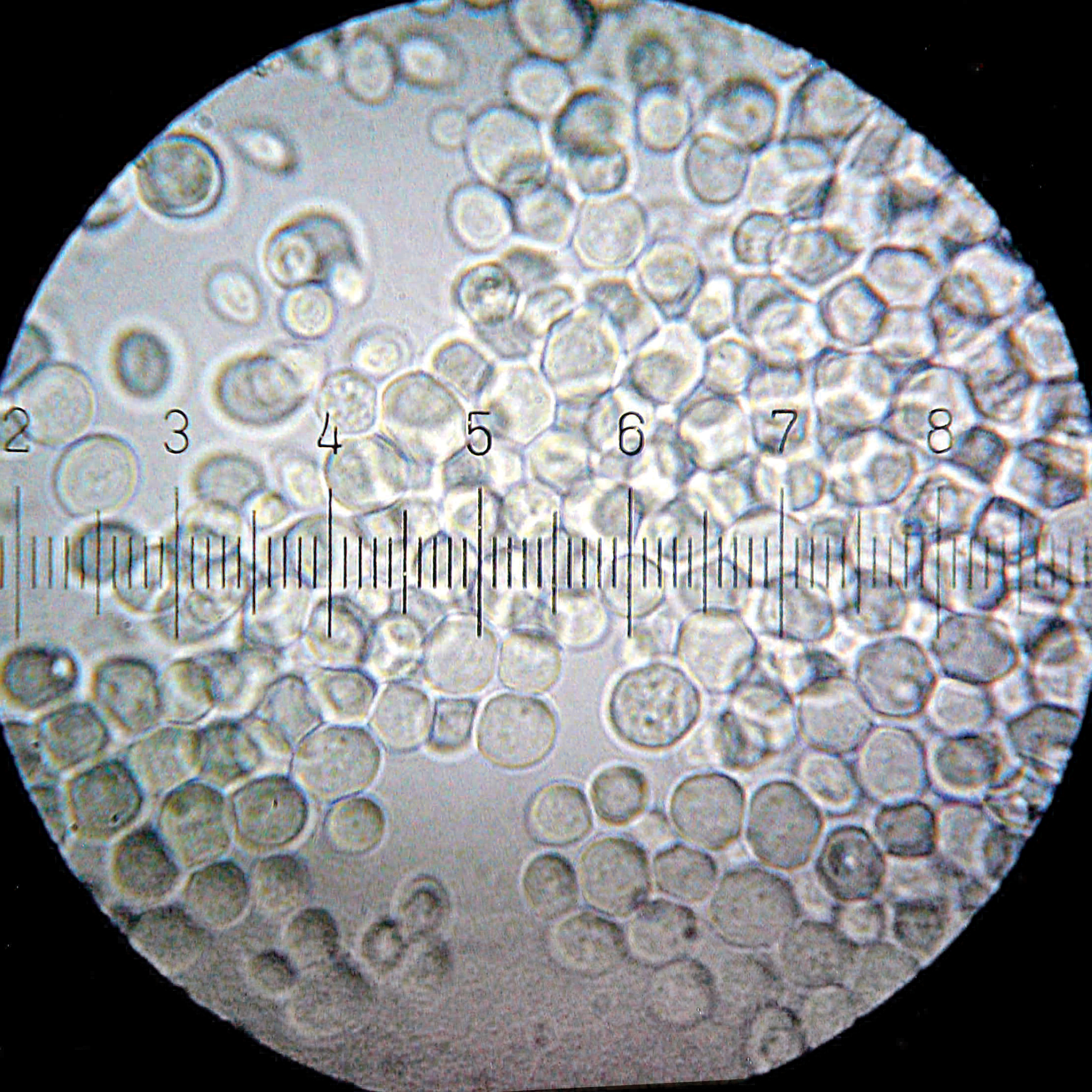
Saccharomyces cerevisiae Numbered ticks are 11 micrometers apart.

When researchers look for an organism to use in their studies, they look for several traits. Among these are size, short generation time, accessibility, ease of manipulation, genetics, conservation of mechanisms, and potential economic benefit. The yeast species Schizosaccharomyces pombe and S. cerevisiae are both well studied; these two species diverged approximately 600 to 300 million years ago, and are significant tools in the study of DNA damage and repair mechanisms.

S. cerevisiae has developed as a model organism because it scores favorably on a number of criteria.

- As a single-cell organism, S. cerevisiae is small with a short generation time (doubling time 1.25–2 hours at 30 °C or 86 °F) and can be easily cultured. These are all positive characteristics in that they allow for the swift production and maintenance of multiple specimen lines at low cost.
- S. cerevisiae divides with meiosis, allowing it to be a candidate for sexual genetics research.
- S. cerevisiae can be transformed allowing for either the addition of new genes or deletion through homologous recombination. Furthermore, the ability to grow S. cerevisiae as a haploid simplifies the creation of gene knockout strains.
- As an eukaryote, S. cerevisiae shares the complex internal cell structure of plants and animals without the high percentage of non-coding DNA that can confound research in higher eukaryotes.
- S. cerevisiae research is a strong economic driver, at least initially, as a result of its established use in industry.

=== In the study of aging ===
For more than five decades S. cerevisiae has been studied as a model organism to better understand aging and has contributed to the identification of more mammalian genes affecting aging than any other model organism. Some of the topics studied using yeast are calorie restriction, as well as in genes and cellular pathways involved in senescence. The two most common methods of measuring aging in yeast are Replicative Life Span (RLS), which measures the number of times a cell divides, and Chronological Life Span (CLS), which measures how long a cell can survive in a non-dividing stasis state. Limiting the amount of glucose or amino acids in the growth medium has been shown to increase RLS and CLS in yeast as well as other organisms. At first, this was thought to increase RLS by up-regulating the sir2 enzyme; however, it was later discovered that this effect is independent of sir2. Over-expression of the genes sir2 and fob1 has been shown to increase RLS by preventing the accumulation of extrachromosomal rDNA circles, which are thought to be one of the causes of senescence in yeast. The effects of dietary restriction may be the result of a decreased signaling in the TOR cellular pathway. This pathway modulates the cell's response to nutrients, and mutations that decrease TOR activity were found to increase CLS and RLS. This has also been shown to be the case in other animals. A yeast mutant lacking the genes Sch9 and Ras2 has recently been shown to have a tenfold increase in chronological lifespan under conditions of calorie restriction and is the largest increase achieved in any organism.

Mother cells give rise to progeny buds by mitotic divisions, but undergo replicative aging over successive generations and ultimately die. However, when a mother cell undergoes meiosis and gametogenesis, lifespan is reset. The replicative potential of gametes (spores) formed by aged cells is the same as gametes formed by young cells, indicating that age-associated damage is removed by meiosis from aged mother cells. This observation suggests that during meiosis removal of age-associated damages leads to rejuvenation. However, the nature of these damages remains to be established.

During starvation of non-replicating S. cerevisiae cells, reactive oxygen species increase leading to the accumulation of DNA damages such as apurinic/apyrimidinic sites and double-strand breaks. Also in non-replicating cells the ability to repair endogenous double-strand breaks declines during chronological aging.

=== Meiosis, recombination, and DNA repair ===
S. cerevisiae reproduces by mitosis as diploid cells when nutrients are abundant. However, when starved, these cells undergo meiosis to form haploid spores.

Evidence from studies of S. cerevisiae bear on the adaptive function of meiosis and recombination. Mutations defective in genes essential for meiotic and mitotic recombination in S. cerevisiae cause increased sensitivity to radiation or DNA damaging chemicals. For instance, gene rad52 is required for both meiotic recombination and mitotic recombination. Rad52 mutants have increased sensitivity to killing by X-rays, Methyl methanesulfonate and the DNA cross-linking agent 8-methoxypsoralen-plus-UVA, and show reduced meiotic recombination. These findings suggest that recombination repair during meiosis and mitosis is needed for repair of the different damages caused by these agents.

Ruderfer et al. (2006) analyzed the ancestry of natural S. cerevisiae strains and concluded that outcrossing occurs only about once every 50,000 cell divisions. Thus, it appears that in nature, mating is likely most often between closely related yeast cells. Mating occurs when haploid cells of opposite mating type MATa and MATα come into contact. Ruderfer et al. pointed out that such contacts are frequent between closely related yeast cells for two reasons. The first is that cells of opposite mating type are present together in the same ascus, the sac that contains the cells directly produced by a single meiosis, and these cells can mate with each other. The second reason is that haploid cells of one mating type, upon cell division, often produce cells of the opposite mating type with which they can mate. The relative rarity in nature of meiotic events that result from outcrossing is inconsistent with the idea that production of genetic variation is the main selective force maintaining meiosis in this organism. However, this finding is consistent with the alternative idea that the main selective force maintaining meiosis is enhanced recombinational repair of DNA damage, since this benefit is realized during each meiosis, whether or not out-crossing occurs.

=== Genome sequencing ===
S. cerevisiae was the first eukaryotic genome to be completely sequenced. The genome sequence was released to the public domain on April 24, 1996. Since then, regular updates have been maintained at the Saccharomyces Genome Database. This database is a highly annotated and cross-referenced database for yeast researchers. Another important S. cerevisiae database is maintained by the Munich Information Center for Protein Sequences (MIPS). Further information is located at the Yeastract curated repository.

The S. cerevisiae genome is composed of about 12,156,677 base pairs and 6,275 genes, compactly organized on 16 chromosomes. Only about 5,800 of these genes are believed to be functional. It is estimated at least 31% of yeast genes have homologs in the human genome. Yeast genes are classified using gene symbols (such as Sch9) or systematic names. In the latter case the 16 chromosomes of yeast are represented by the letters A to P, then the gene is further classified by a sequence number on the left or right arm of the chromosome, and a letter showing which of the two DNA strands contains its coding sequence.

Systematic gene names for Baker's yeast
Example gene name	YGL118W
Y	the Y indicates this is a yeast gene
G	chromosome on which the gene is located (chromosome 1 = A etc.)
L	left or right arm of the chromosome
118	sequence number of the gene/ORF on this arm, starting at the centromere
W	whether the coding sequence is on the Watson or Crick strand

Examples:

- YBR134C (aka SUP45 encoding eRF1, a translation termination factor) is located on the right arm of chromosome 2 and is the 134th open reading frame (ORF) on that arm, starting from the centromere. The coding sequence is on the Crick strand of the DNA.
- YDL102W (aka POL3 encoding a subunit of DNA polymerase delta) is located on the left arm of chromosome 4; it is the 102nd ORF from the centromere and codes from the Watson strand of the DNA.

=== Gene function and interactions ===
The availability of deletion mutants covering 90% of the yeast genome has allowed researchers to study the biological and molecular function of almost all genes. For instance, deletions of 171 (out of 182) gene-specific transcription factors has shown that about half of them do not have a strong impact on gene expression (at least under a certain growth condition). However, a median of 19 transcripts is change in these deletions, explaining how transcription factors affect specific genes and their expression.

When two genes are deleted, so-called "genetic interactions" can be revealed. For example, the deletion of either gene A or gene B may have only a weak phenotype, but a double-deletion mutant may have a strong phenotype, indicating that the two genes may complement each other functionally. Performed on a large scale, such tests have been called synthetic genetic arrays ("synthetic" because they combine or "synthesize" gene deletions).

A 2010 study of genetic interactions contained "the interaction profiles for ~75% of all genes in the Budding yeast". This model was made from 5.4 million two-gene comparisons in which a double gene knockout for each combination of the genes studied was performed. The effect of the double knockout on the fitness of the cell was compared to the expected fitness. Expected fitness is determined from the sum of the results on fitness of single-gene knockouts for each compared gene. When there is a change in fitness from what is expected, the genes are presumed to interact with each other. This was tested by comparing the results to what was previously known. For example, the genes Par32, Ecm30, and Ubp15 had similar interaction profiles to genes involved in the Gap1-sorting module cellular process. Consistent with the results, these genes, when knocked out, disrupted that process, confirming that they are part of it.

From this, 170,000 gene interactions were found and genes with similar interaction patterns were grouped together. Genes with similar genetic interaction profiles tend to be part of the same pathway or biological process. This information was used to construct a global network of gene interactions organized by function. This network can be used to predict the function of uncharacterized genes based on the functions of genes they are grouped with.

=== Other tools in yeast research ===
Approaches that can be applied in many different fields of biological and medicinal science have been developed by yeast scientists. These include yeast two-hybrid for studying protein interactions and tetrad analysis. Other resources, include a gene deletion library including ~4,700 viable haploid single gene deletion strains. A GFP fusion strain library used to study protein localisation and a TAP tag library used to purify protein from yeast cell extracts.

Stanford University's yeast deletion project created knockout mutations of every gene in the S. cerevisiae genome to determine their function.

=== Synthetic yeast chromosomes and genomes ===
The yeast genome is highly accessible to manipulation, hence it is an excellent model for genome engineering.

The international Synthetic Yeast Genome Project (Sc2.0 or Saccharomyces cerevisiae version 2.0) aims to build an entirely designer, customizable, synthetic S. cerevisiae genome from scratch that is more stable than the wild type. In the synthetic genome all transposons, repetitive elements, and many introns are removed, all UAG stop codons are replaced with UAA, and transfer RNA genes are moved to a novel neochromosome. As of March 2017, 6 of the 16 chromosomes have been synthesized and tested. No significant fitness defects have been found.

All 16 chromosomes can be fused into one single chromosome by successive end-to-end chromosome fusions and centromere deletions. The single-chromosome and wild-type yeast cells have nearly identical transcriptomes and similar phenotypes. The giant single chromosome can support cell life, although this strain shows reduced growth across environments, competitiveness, gamete production and viability.

=== Astrobiology ===
Among other microorganisms, a sample of living S. cerevisiae was included in the Living Interplanetary Flight Experiment, which would have completed a three-year interplanetary round-trip in a small capsule aboard the Russian Fobos-Grunt spacecraft, launched in late 2011. The goal was to test whether selected organisms could survive a few years in deep space by flying them through interplanetary space. The experiment would have tested one aspect of transpermia, the hypothesis that life could survive space travel, if protected inside rocks blasted by impact off one planet to land on another. Fobos-Grunt's mission ended unsuccessfully, however, when it failed to escape low Earth orbit. The spacecraft along with its instruments fell into the Pacific Ocean in an uncontrolled re-entry on January 15, 2012. The next planned exposure mission in deep space using S. cerevisiae is BioSentinel. (see: List of microorganisms tested in outer space)

== In commercial applications ==
=== Brewing ===
Saccharomyces cerevisiae is used in brewing beer, when it is sometimes called a top-fermenting or top-cropping yeast. It is so called because during the fermentation process its hydrophobic surface causes the flocs to adhere to CO_{2} and rise to the top of the fermentation vessel. Top-fermenting yeasts are fermented at higher temperatures than the lager yeast Saccharomyces pastorianus, and the resulting beers have a different flavor from the same beverage fermented with a lager yeast. "Fruity esters" may be formed if the yeast undergoes temperatures near 21 °C (70 °F), or if the fermentation temperature of the beverage fluctuates during the process. Lager yeast normally ferments at a temperature of approximately 5 °C (41 °F) or 278 k, where Saccharomyces cerevisiae becomes dormant. A variant yeast known as Saccharomyces cerevisiae var. diastaticus is a beer spoiler which can cause secondary fermentations in packaged products.

In May 2013, the Oregon legislature made S. cerevisiae the official state microbe in recognition of the impact craft beer brewing has had on the state economy and the state's identity.

=== Baking ===
S. cerevisiae is used in baking; the carbon dioxide generated by the fermentation is used as a leavening agent in bread and other baked goods. Historically, this use was closely linked to the brewing industry's use of yeast, as bakers took or bought the barm or yeast-filled foam from brewing ale from the brewers (producing the barm cake); today, brewing and baking yeast strains are somewhat different.

=== Nutritional yeast ===
Saccharomyces cerevisiae is the main source of nutritional yeast, which is sold commercially as a food product. It is popular with vegans and vegetarians as an ingredient in cheese substitutes, or as a general food additive as a source of vitamins and minerals, especially amino acids and B-complex vitamins.

=== Selenium yeast ===
Saccharomyces cerevisiae is grown in selenium-rich media to produce a yeast rich in organic selenium compounds that can be more easily absorbed by animals including humans. At the levels used, random misincorporation of seleno amino acids in lieu of sulfur amino acids happen.

=== Uses in aquaria ===
Owing to the high cost of commercial CO_{2} cylinder systems, CO_{2} injection by yeast is one of the most popular DIY approaches followed by aquaculturists for providing CO_{2} to underwater aquatic plants. The yeast culture is, in general, maintained in plastic bottles, and typical systems provide one bubble every 3–7 seconds. Various approaches have been devised to allow proper absorption of the gas into the water.

=== Uses in biotechnology ===
S. cerevisiae is a suitable expression system for producing various therapeutic recombinant proteins.

== Direct use in medicine ==
Saccharomyces cerevisiae is used as a probiotic in humans and animals. The strain Saccharomyces cerevisiae var. boulardii is industrially manufactured and used clinically as a medication.

Several clinical and experimental studies have shown that S. cerevisiae var. boulardii is, to some extent, useful for prevention or treatment of several gastrointestinal diseases. Moderate quality evidence has shown S. cerevisiae var. boulardii reduces risk of antibiotic-associated diarrhea both in adults and in children and to reduce risk of adverse effects of Helicobacter pylori eradication therapy. There is some evidence to support efficacy of S. cerevisiae var. boulardii in prevention (but not treatment) of traveler's diarrhoea and, at least as an adjunct medication, in treatment of acute diarrhoea in adults and children and of persistent diarrhoea in children. It may also reduce symptoms of allergic rhinitis.

Administration of S. cerevisiae var. boulardii is considered generally safe. In clinical trials, it was well tolerated by patients, and the adverse effects rate was similar to that in control groups (i. e., groups with placebo or no treatment). No case of S. cerevisiae var. boulardii fungemia has been reported during clinical trials.

In clinical practice, however, cases of fungemia, caused by S. cerevisiae var. boulardii are reported. Patients with compromised immunity or those with central vascular catheters are at special risk. Some researchers have recommended avoiding use of S. cerevisiae var. boulardii as treatment in such patients. Others suggest only that caution must be exercised with its use in risk group patients.

== As a human pathogen ==
Saccharomyces cerevisiae is proven to be an opportunistic human pathogen, though of relatively low virulence. Despite widespread use of this microorganism at home and in industry, contact with it very rarely leads to infection. Saccharomyces cerevisiae was found in the skin, oral cavity, oropharynx, duodenal mucosa, digestive tract, and vagina of healthy humans (one review found it to be reported for 6% of samples from human intestine). Some specialists consider S. cerevisiae to be a part of the normal microbiota of the gastrointestinal tract, the respiratory tract, and the vagina of humans, while others believe that the species cannot be called a true commensal because it originates in food. Presence of S. cerevisiae in the human digestive system may be rather transient; for example, experiments show that in the case of oral administration to healthy individuals it is eliminated from the intestine within 5 days after the end of administration.

Under certain circumstances, such as degraded immunity, Saccharomyces cerevisiae can cause infection in humans. Studies show that it causes 0.45–1.06% of the cases of yeast-induced vaginitis. In some cases, women suffering from S. cerevisiae-induced vaginal infection were intimate partners of bakers, and the strain was found to be the same that their partners used for baking. As of 1999, no cases of S. cerevisiae-induced vaginitis in women, who worked in bakeries themselves, were reported in scientific literature. Some cases were linked by researchers to the use of the yeast in home baking. Cases of infection of oral cavity and pharynx caused by S. cerevisiae are also known.

=== Invasive and systemic infections ===
Occasionally Saccharomyces cerevisiae causes invasive infections (i.e. gets into the bloodstream or other normally sterile body fluid or into an internal organ, such as lungs, liver, or spleen) that can turn into a potentially life-threatening systemic infection. More than 30% of invasive S. cerevisiae infections lead to death even if treated. S. cerevisiae invasive infections, however, are much rarer than invasive infections caused by Candida albicans, even in patients weakened by cancer. S. cerevisiae causes 1% to 3.6% nosocomial cases of fungemia. A comprehensive review of S. cerevisiae invasive infection cases found all patients to have at least one predisposing condition.

Saccharomyces cerevisiae may enter the bloodstream or get to other deep sites of the body by translocation from oral or enteral mucosa or through contamination of intravascular catheters (e. g. central venous catheters). Intravascular catheters, antibiotic therapy and compromised immunity are major predisposing factors for S. cerevisiae invasive infection.

A number of cases of fungemia were caused by intentional ingestion of living S. cerevisiae cultures for dietary or therapeutic reasons, including use of Saccharomyces boulardii (a strain of S. cerevisiae which is used as a probiotic for treatment of certain forms of diarrhea). Saccharomyces boulardii causes about 40% of invasive Saccharomyces infections and is more likely (in comparison to other S. cerevisiae strains) to cause invasive infection in humans without general problems with immunity, though such adverse effects are very rare relative to Saccharomyces boulardii therapeutic administration.

S. boulardii may contaminate intravascular catheters through hands of medical personnel involved in administering probiotic preparations of S. boulardii to patients.

Systemic infection usually occurs in patients who have their immunity compromised due to severe illness (HIV/AIDS, leukemia, other forms of cancer) or certain medical procedures (bone marrow transplantation, abdominal surgery).

A case was reported of a nodule that was surgically excised from a lung of a man employed in baking, and examination of the tissue revealed presence of Saccharomyces cerevisiae. Inhalation of dry baking yeast powder is supposed to be the source of infection in this case.

=== Virulence of different strains ===
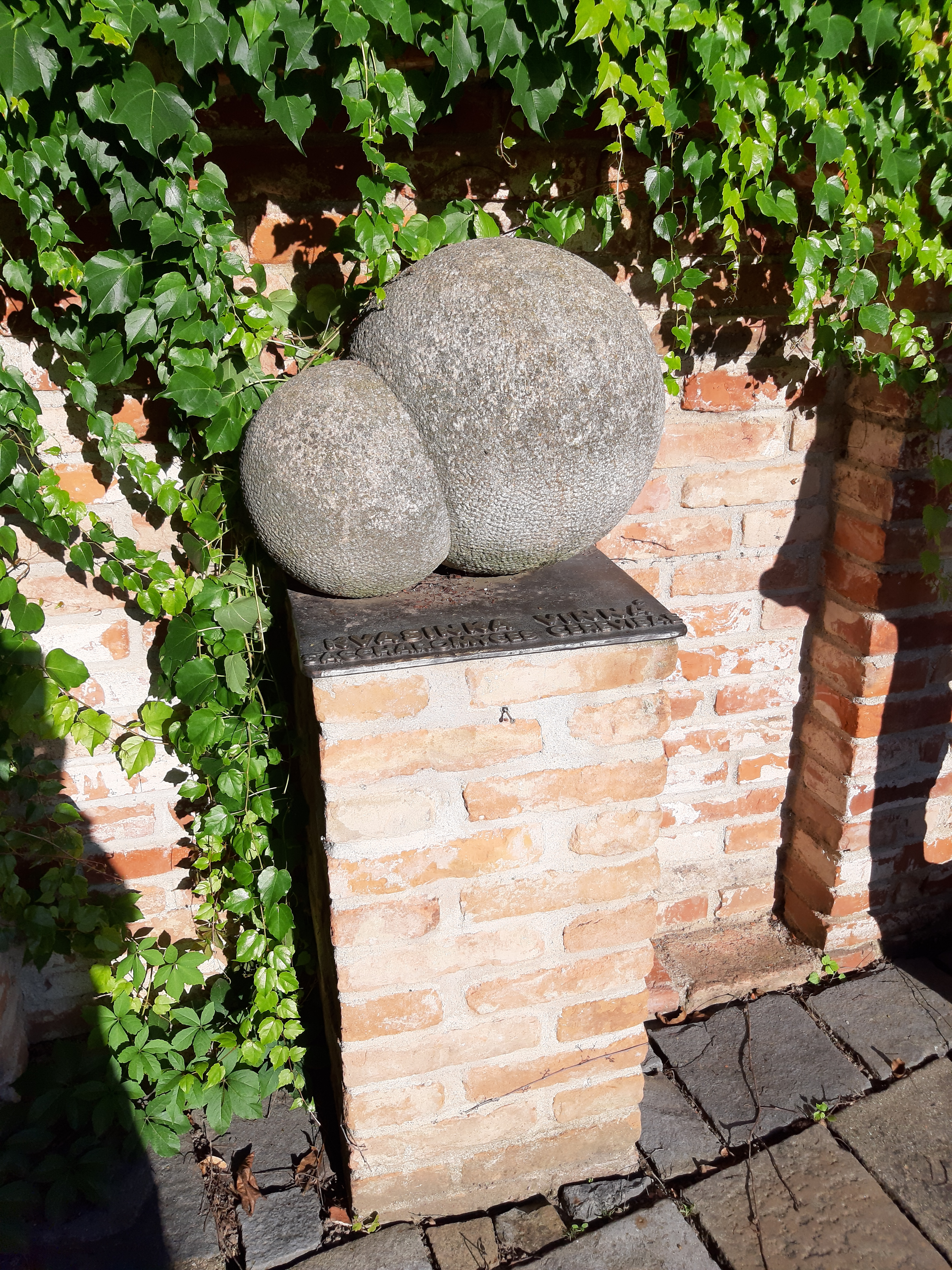
Statue of Saccharomyces cerevisiae (Hustopeče, Czech Republic)

Not all strains of Saccharomyces cerevisiae are equally virulent towards humans. Most environmental strains are not capable of growing at temperatures above 35 °C (i. e. at temperatures of living body of humans and other mammalian). Virulent strains, however, are capable of growing at least above 37 °C and often up to 39 °C (rarely up to 42 °C). Some industrial strains are also capable of growing above 37 °C. The European Food Safety Authority has required that all S. cerevisiae strains capable of growth above 37 °C that are added to the food or feed chain in viable form must, to be qualified as presumably safe, show no resistance to antimycotic drugs used for treatment of yeast infections.

The ability to grow at elevated temperatures is an important factor for a strain's virulence but not the sole one.

Other traits that are usually believed to be associated with virulence are: ability to produce certain enzymes such as proteinase and phospholipase, invasive growth (i.e. growth with intrusion into the nutrient medium), ability to adhere to mammalian cells, ability to survive in the presence of hydrogen peroxide (used by white blood cells to kill foreign microorganisms in the body), and other abilities allowing the yeast to resist or influence immune response of the host body. Ability to form branching chains of cells, known as pseudohyphae, is also sometimes said to be associated with virulence, though some research suggests that this trait may be common to both virulent and non-virulent strains of Saccharomyces cerevisiae.

== See also ==
- Saccharomyces cerevisiae extracts: Vegemite, Marmite, Cenovis, Guinness Yeast Extract, mannan oligosaccharides, pgg-glucan, zymosan
- Saccharomyces cerevisiae boulardii (Saccharomyces boulardii)
- Auto-brewery syndrome
- Biosprint
- BolA-like protein family
- Flora of Door County, Wisconsin § Hybrid yeast
- Saccharomyces cerevisiae virus L-A
- Yeast Promoter Atlas (2010)
- Category:Saccharomyces cerevisiae genes
