= Torque teno sus virus =

Torque teno sus virus Informal group of swine viruses

Scientific classification
- (unranked): Virus
- Realm: Floreoviria
- Kingdom: Shotokuvirae
- Phylum: Commensaviricota
- Class: Cardeaviricetes
- Order: Sanitavirales
- Family: Anelloviridae

Groups included
- Iotatorquevirus; Kappatorquevirus

Cladistically included but traditionally excluded taxa
- Alphatorquevirus; Betatorquevirus; Deltatorquevirus; Epsilontorquevirus; Etatorquevirus; Gammatorquevirus; Gyrovirus; Thetatorquevirus; Zetatorquevirus

Species of virus

Torque teno sus virus (TTSuV, swine TTV, porcine anellovirus), belonging to the family Anelloviridae, is a group of virus strains that are non-enveloped, with a single-stranded circular DNA genome ranging from 2.6 to 2.8 kb in size. These swine infecting anelloviruses are divided into two genera: Iotatorquevirus and Kappatorquevirus. Torque teno sus virus has been found in pigs (Sus domesticus) worldwide. TTSuVs are mainly transmitted by fecal-oral route. The prevalence of these viruses is relatively high. For now, there is no known disease caused exclusively by TTSuV. There is the possibility that TTSuV may worsen the progression of other diseases and therefore increase the economic losses for pig industry.

== History ==
In the nineties, Torque teno virus (TTV) was first found in a Japanese patient. In 2002, the genome of Torque teno sus virus (TTSuV), isolated from swine serum, was first sequenced in Japan.

== Taxonomy ==
TTSuVs belong to the family Anelloviridae. Torque teno sus virus (TTSuV) is subdivided into two genera and three species. The genus Iotatorquevirus (TTSuV1) includes TTSuV1a, and the genus Kappatorquevirus comprises TTSuVk2a and TTSuVk2b.

== Structure ==
Torque teno sus virus (TTSuV) is a non‐enveloped virus with a circular single‐stranded DNA genome of negative polarity ranging from 2.6 to 2.8 kb in size. The genome has three open reading frames, ORF1 (capsid), ORF2 and ORF3 and a highly conserved untranslated region. Open reading frames (ORFs) encode approximately 500 (ORF1), 100 (ORF2) and 200 (ORF3) aminoacids.

== Viral spread ==
The virus is transmitted mainly by the fecal-oral route. The virus has been detected in a number of tissues including liver, brain, sera, semen, nasal secretion, lymph node, heart, liver, bone marrow, lung or spleen. It was confirmed that the TTSuV can be detected also in bile.

TTSuV is ubiquitous in pig farms worldwide. The prevalence varies between 31 and 90% for TTSuVk2 and between 17 and 100% for TTSuV1. Generally, the prevalence increases with the age of animals.

== Clinical ==
TTSuV is commonly detected in healthy pigs. For now, there is not known disease caused exclusively by TTSuV. However, the co-infection with other swine pathogens is described. Probably, TTSuV could trigger the development of certain diseases or increase the severity of diseases. Studies have shown that TTSuV could serve as a trigger in the pathogenesis of post-weaning multisystemic wasting syndrome (PMWS) caused by Porcine circovirus type 2 (PCV2). However, it is still unclear whether the co-infection contributes to the PMWS or vice versa.
