= Psittacine beak and feather disease =

Beak and feather disease virus

Virus classification
- (unranked): Virus
- Realm: Floreoviria
- Kingdom: Shotokuvirae
- Phylum: Cressdnaviricota
- Class: Arfiviricetes
- Order: Cirlivirales
- Family: Circoviridae
- Genus: Circovirus
- Species: Circovirus parrot

Viral disease affecting parrots

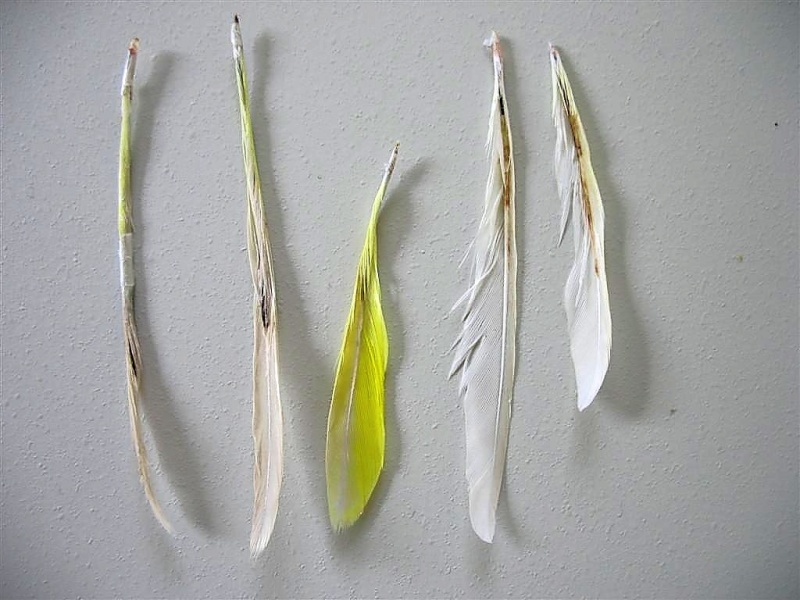
PBFD feathers of a budgerigar

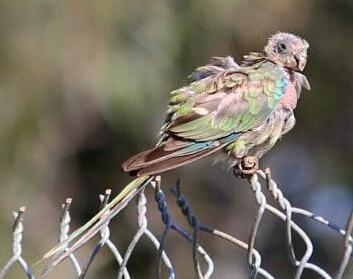
PBFD affected red-rumped parrot

Psittacine beak and feather disease (PBFD) is a viral disease affecting all Old World and New World parrots. The causative virus—beak and feather disease virus (BFDV)—belongs to the taxonomic genus Circovirus, family Circoviridae. It attacks the feather follicles and the beak and claw matrices of the bird, causing progressive feather, claw and beak malformation and necrosis. In later stages of the disease, feather shaft constriction occurs, hampering development until eventually all feather growth stops. It occurs in an acutely fatal form and a chronic form.

Cracking and peeling of the outer layers of the claws and beak make tissues vulnerable to secondary infection. Because the virus also affects the thymus and Bursa of Fabricius, slowing lymphocyte production, immunosuppression occurs, which also means the bird becomes more vulnerable to secondary infections. Beak fractures and necrosis of the hard palate can prevent the bird from eating.

== History ==
Psittacine beak and feather disease was first described in the early 1980s and has become recognised as the dominant viral pathogen of psittacine birds worldwide. In wild red-rumped grass parakeets (Psephotus haematonotus), a case of feather loss syndrome, that was highly suggestive of PBFD, was first recorded in South Australia in 1907. The virus causing PBFD was initially designated as psittacine circovirus but has since been renamed beak and feather disease virus (BFDV).

The condition is more prevalent in widely occurring Australian species such as the sulphur-crested cockatoo, little corella and galah.

The first case of chronic PBFD was reported by Ross Perry in a Control and Therapy article in 1972 for the University of Sydney, in which he described it as "beak rot in a cockatoo". Dr. Perry subsequently studied the disease and wrote extensively about its clinical features in a range of psittacine birds in a long article in which he named the disease "psittacine beak and feather disease syndrome" (PBFDS). This soon became known as psittacine beak and feather disease (PBFD).

Earlier observations of what may have been PBFD were recorded in 1888 by the ornithologist Edwin Ashby, observing a flock of completely featherless red-rumped parrots (Psephotus haematonotus) in the Adelaide Hills, South Australia. The species then disappeared from the area for several years.

== Beak and feather disease virus ==
PBFD is caused by the beak and feather disease virus (BFDV), a circular or icosahedral, 14–16 nm (1.4×10^{−5}–1.6×10^{−5} mm) diameter, single-stranded circular DNA, non-enveloped virus with a genome size of between 1992 and 2018 nucleotides. It encodes seven open reading frames—three in the virion strand and four in the complementary strand. The open reading frames have some homology to porcine circovirus (family Circoviridae), subterranean clover stunt virus and faba bean necrotic yellows virus (both family Nanoviridae).

=== History ===
BFDV was first isolated and characterized by researchers David Pass of Murdoch University in Perth and Ross Perry from Sydney, with later work at the University of Georgia in the United States, the University of Sydney and Murdoch University in Australia, and the University of Cape Town, among other centres. The virus was originally designated PCV (psittacine circovirus), but has since been renamed beak and feather disease virus. This is due in part, to the research confirming that this virus is the cause of the disease, and in part to avoid confusion with Porcine circovirus, also called PCV.

=== Detection ===
A variety of tests for the presence of BFDV are available: standard polymerase chain reaction (PCR), quantitative PCR (qPCR) which can detect the virus in extremely small quantities, whole-genome sequencing, histology, immunohistochemical tests, and quantitative haemagglutination assays.

=== Structure ===
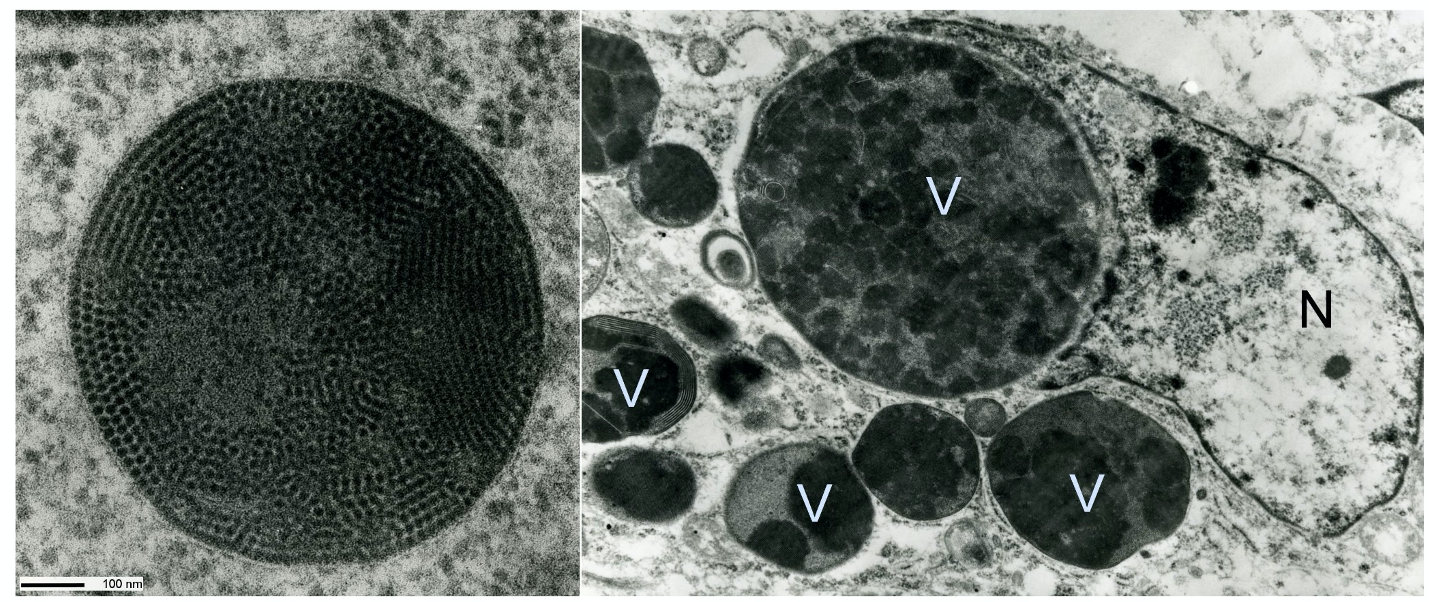
Transmission electron micrograph of BFDV infected cell on the right demonstrating how the nucleus (N) is relatively sparse, with large crystalline arrays of mature virus particles preferentially forming intracytoplasmic inclusions (V) shown at higher magnification on the left

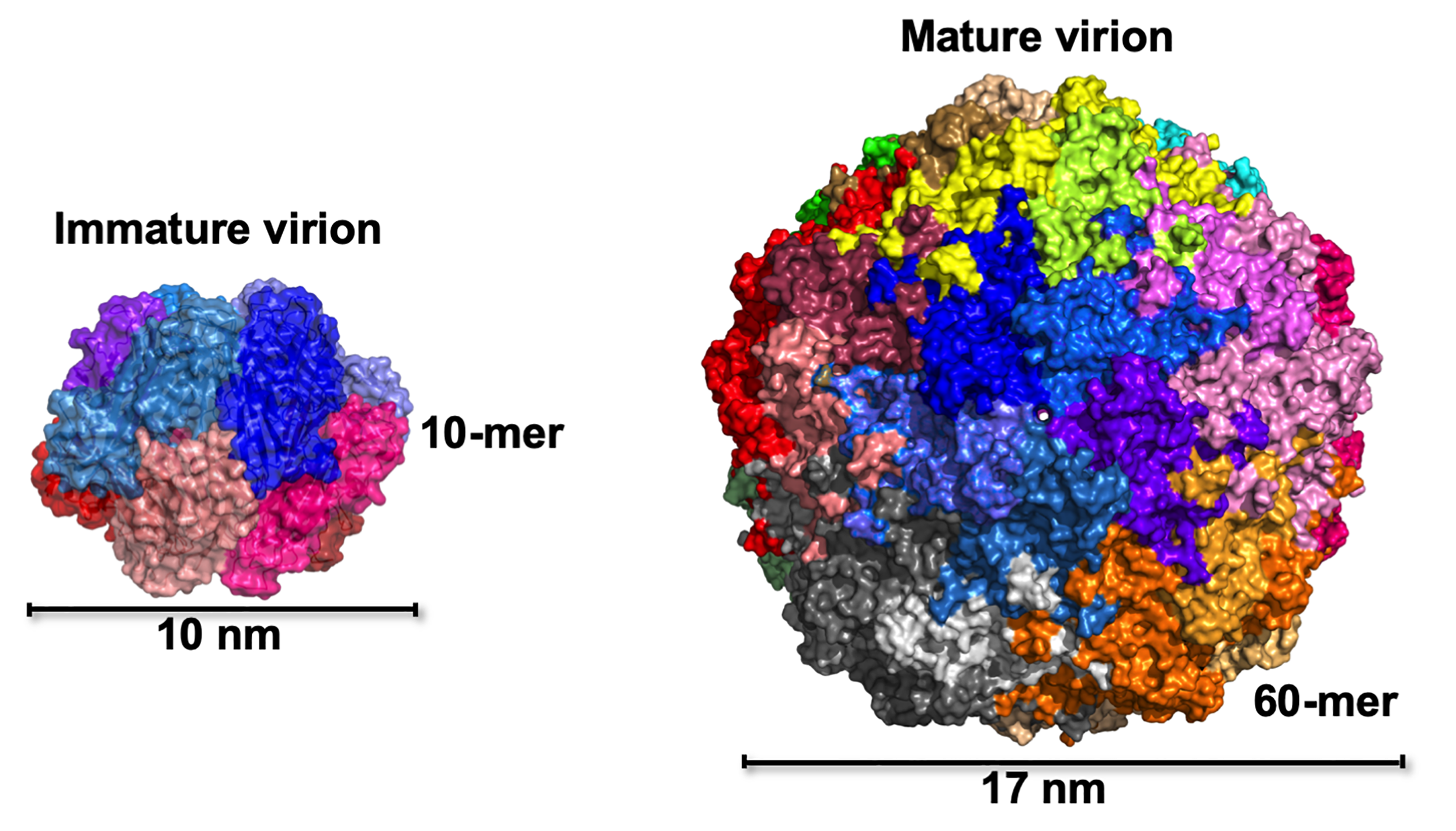
Structural characterisation of two BFDV capsid virions. X-ray crystal structures allow modelling of the two particles to 1.9 Å (10 nm-immature virions, left), and 2.5 Å (60 nm-mature virions, right). The smaller particle is composed of 10 capsid molecules arranged as two interlocking discs, with each disc containing five capsid molecules. The larger VLP consists of 12 pentamers arranged with T=1 icosahedral symmetry.

The beak and feather disease virus (BFDV) is currently considered a member of the family Circoviridae. Like other circoviruses, BFDV possesses a small, circular single-stranded DNA (ssDNA) genome (approximately 2.0 kb in length) that is encapsidated into a non-enveloped, spherical icosahedral virion. In order to replicate its genome, BFDV needs to invade the nucleus to access the transcriptional machinery of the host cell. The replication of BFDV is known to occur in numerous tissues, including skin, liver, gastrointestinal tract, and bursa of Fabricius; while the capsid antigen of BFDV is found in the spleen, thymus, thyroid, parathyroid and bone marrow. However, the distinction between viral entry and replication in a host cell remains unclear in the absence of confirmation in suitable cell culture. Viral attachment and entry into host cells may not necessarily lead to viral replication, and consequently not all cells containing viral particles may contribute to the disease progression. However, it is thought that the BFDV encodes proteins that actively transport the viral genome into the nucleus, as well as factors that direct the precursor DNA exit to the cytoplasm, where it causes large globular intracytoplasmic paracrystalline arrays.

The BFDV genome is bi-directionally transcribed and encodes at least two major proteins: a replication initiation protein (rep) expressed from the virion strand and a capsid protein (cap) expressed from the complementary strand. A recent study conducted by Sarker et al. used a combination of X-ray crystallography, cryo-electron microscopy and atomic force microscopy to investigate the functionality of cap and its interaction with a range of host and viral proteins. They confirmed that the cap protein forms virus-like particles (VLPs) of ~17 nm (mature form) and a smaller assembly of ~10 nm (immature form). Furthermore, this study demonstrated that assembly of these two VLPs is regulated by single-stranded DNA (ssDNA), and that they provide a structural basis of capsid assembly around single-stranded DNA.

== Host range and transmission ==
BFDV infection was thought to be restricted to within Psittaciformes, but evidence of host switching among distantly-related Australian avian species was recently demonstrated in the rainbow bee-eater (Merops ornatus), powerful owl (Ninox strenua) and finches. A large number of other non-psittacine birds are likely susceptible to sporadic spill-over infection, and there is unpublished evidence of BFDV-associated feather disease in the laughing kookaburra (Daceolo novaeguineae), columbids, corvids and raptors including the wedge-tailed eagle (Aquila audax), white-breasted sea eagle (Haliaetus leucogaster), peregrine falcon (Falco peregrinus) and whistling kite (Haliastur sphenurus). However, the actual mechanism of this host-switch event in raptors and other species is not well understood. Presumably, it occurs in raptors and other birds following predation and/or opportunistic feeding upon the tissues or excretions of BFDV-affected parrots. Knemidokoptes mites have recently been shown to concentrate BFDV within their faeces which raises the possibility of ectoparasites such as hippoboscid flies acting as fomites and vectors of transmission particularly to insectivorous bird species such as the rainbow bee-eater. Interestingly, while interseasonal nest hollow sharing may promote the circulation of novel BFDV genotypes in psittacine populations, species such as raptors, which retain nest hollows over many seasons, may not have sufficient intraspecific transmission frequencies to permit permanent host switching.

Beak and feather disease virus is the dominant viral pathogen of Psittaciformes in Australasia, where it has been present for at least 10 million years, and Australia has been identified as the most likely origin of the virus. The richness of psittacine avifauna in this region has produced a mixture of potential hosts for the pathogens, resulting in competing forces of virus co-evolution, spill-over infection and virus host-switches within parrots, cockatoos and lorikeets. Recent evidence has shown that all threatened and endangered Australian psittacine bird species can be infected by BFDV genotypes from any other closely- or distantly-related host reservoir species. Currently, more than 78 psittacine bird species globally have been reported to be infected by BFDV, including at least 38 of the 50 Australian native parrot species both in captivity and the wild, and over 25 non-psittacine bird species.

=== Infection paths ===
Transmission is thought to include both vertical transmission (nestlings from their parents) and horizontal transmission (from other members of the flock). In wild bird populations, transmission of infection most likely occurs within nest hollows by oral or intracloacal ingestion of the virus possibly sourced from feather dust, crop secretions, or faeces. Although there has been debate in the literature concerning the role of vertical transmission of avian circovirus, BFDV is suspected to be transmitted vertically because viral DNA can be found in embryos from infected hens. However, this could simply be the result of non-replicative transfer of viral DNA into the yolk of embryonated eggs. Adult birds coming into contact with the virus usually (but not always) develop resistance to it, but the virus is retained in their bodies and, in most cases, is excreted in feces and feather debris for the rest of their lives.

== Signs and symptoms ==
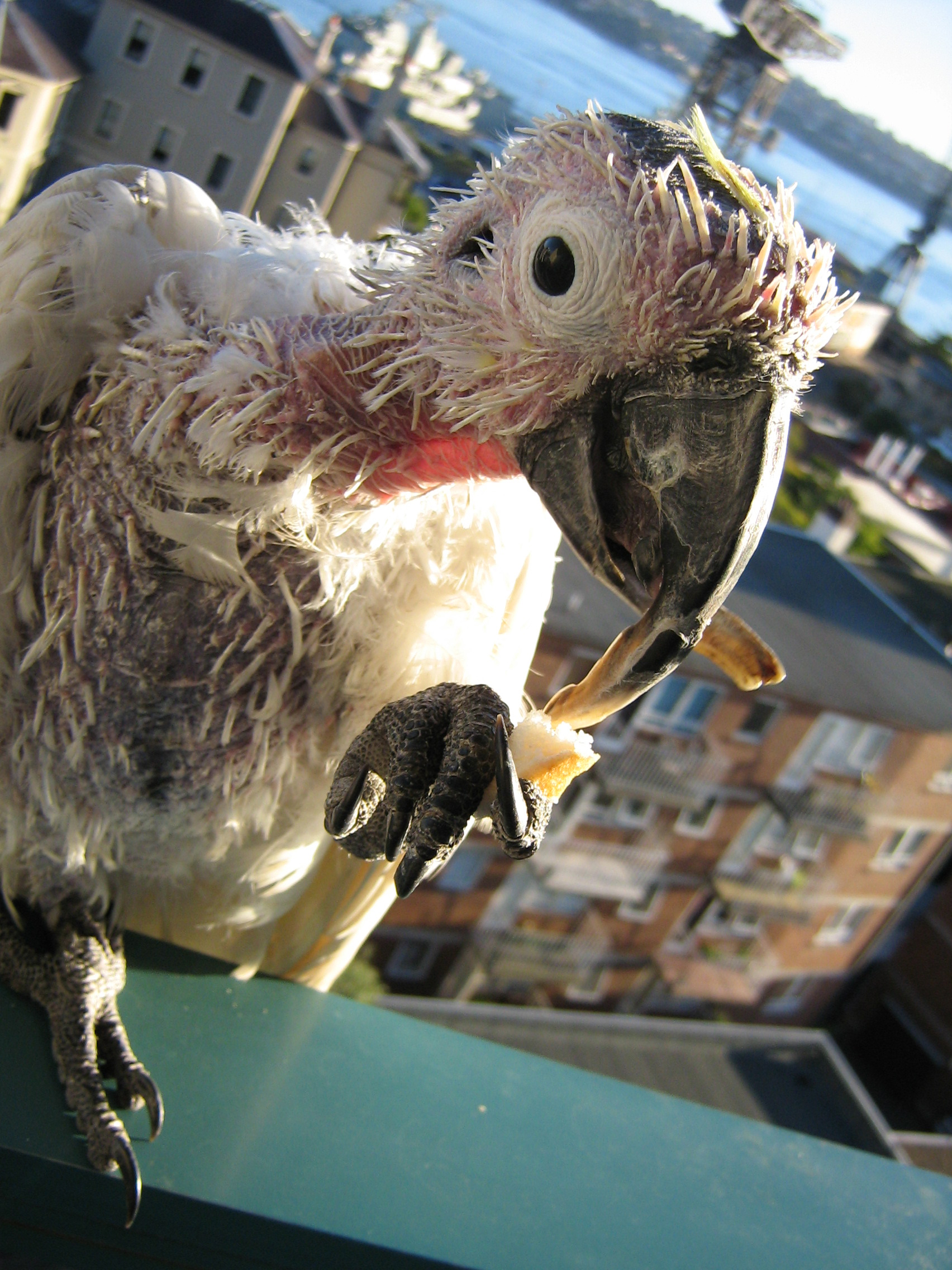
Affected sulphur-crested cockatoo

The disease presents as an immunosuppressive condition with chronic symmetrical irreversible loss of feathers as well as beak and claw deformities, eventually leading to death. The characteristic feather symptoms only appear during the first moult after infection. In those species having powder down, signs may be visible immediately, as powder down feathers are continually replenished.

It can also be expressed peracutely, ranging from sudden death, particularly in neonates, to an acute form in nestling and fledglings, characterised by feather dystrophy, diarrhoea, weakness and depression ultimately leading to death within 1–2 weeks. In some species with green plumage, the presence of scattered yellow contour feathers throughout the plumage is often the first clinical signs of PBFD. In juvenile crimson rosellas (Platycercus elegans) early signs include subtle feather dystrophy, segmentally retained feather sheaths and feather loss around the nares.

Secondary viral, fungal, bacterial, or parasitic infections often occur as a result of diminished immunity caused by a PBFD viral infection. Clinical signs in addition to those mentioned above, including elevated white blood cell counts, are generally due to secondary infections and may not be directly related to PBFD virus infections. Furthermore, not all infected birds develop feather lesions. Some respond with an appropriate immune response and recover. There is also considerable evidence, at least in lovebirds and orange-bellied parrots, of persistent infections in otherwise normal-appearing individuals. It is likely that these subclinically infected birds, in addition to ones with feather dysplasia, are responsible for shedding into the environment and infection of susceptible birds.

== Diagnosis ==
Various approaches have been developed and employed for the diagnosis of BFDV. These include histology, electron microscopy, haemagglutination, immunohistochemistry, in situ hybridisation, polymerase chain reaction (PCR), duplex shuttle PCR, real-time PCR, PCR followed by high-resolution melting curve analysis, and swarm primer-applied loop-mediated isothermal amplification (sLAMP). The serological detection of anti-BFDV antibodies has been conducted by haemagglutination inhibition and enzyme-linked immunosorbent assay (ELISA). So far, the standard PCR-based assay has been used most frequently (>49%) to screen BFDV between 1984 and July 2015. A recently developed sLAMP assay may serve as a rapid, sensitive, and specific diagnostic field test for the detection of BFDV in clinical samples.

== Impacts ==
The disease is recognised as an infectious threat for endangered Australian psittacine birds and constitutes a well-characterised threat to a wide variety of psittacine and non-psittacine bird species globally. It has the potential to become a significant threat to all species of wild parrots and to modern aviculture, due to international legal and illegal bird trade. A large number of psittacine and non-psittacine bird species globally are currently affected by BFDV both in captivity and in the wild, and the disease has the potential to disrupt vital ecosystem processes and services. A recent study has shown the importance of an accurate evaluation of avian diseases in wild populations, since invasive parrots may introduce BFDV without showing any visually detectable clinical signs. PBFD was one of the first diseases to be recognised as threatening under the Endangered Species Protection Act 1992 (ESP Act). The Environment Protection and Biodiversity Conservation Act 1999 developed a threat abatement plan (TAP) with two broad goals: ensure that PBFD does not escalate the threatened species status of affected birds; and minimise the likelihood of PBFD becoming a key threatening process (KTP) for other psittacine species. In June 2015, a ministerial review concluded that the goals of the TAP had not been met due to considerable deficits in knowledge concerning PBFD.

=== Threat ===
PBFD has the potential to become a major threat to all species of wild parrots and to modern aviculture, due to international legal and illegal bird trade. Cases of PBFD have now been reported in at least 78 psittacine species. At least 38 of 50 Australian native species are affected by PBFD, both captive and in the wild. In 2004, PBFD was listed as a key threatening process by the Australian Commonwealth Government for the survival of five endangered species, including one of the few remaining species of migratory parrots, the orange-bellied parrot, of which only an estimated 3 mating pairs remained in 2017.

== Treatment and control ==
Because currently no commercially viable specific treatment for birds affected with chronic PBFD exists, PBFD can be a terminal illness for parrots. Epidemiological studies have shown a high seroprevalence in wild and captive flocks, indicating that infection does not always lead to the development of feather lesions. Testing regimes currently rely on a combination of viral DNA testing using PCR methods, and excreted antigen detection in feather dander using haemagglutination assay (HA) alongside serology using haemagglutination inhibition (HI). The results can identify subclinical birds that are infected but not excreting virus, while also serving to monitor for an antibody response in those birds which have been exposed to infection. Depending on the stage of infection, the PCR-positive or -negative status of infected birds can wax and wane while they develop HI antibody. In some species, a positive HI antibody result is strong evidence of freedom from infection and disease. Culling of infected birds is normally performed in infected captive or commercial flocks. There is an ongoing need to develop a vaccine to combat BFDV infection.

Therapeutic intervention is therefore limited to treating secondary infections, and management of the disease lies mostly in prevention. It has been recommended that a combination of quarantine and hygiene control, diagnostic testing and enhancing flock adaptive immunity should be practised to provide the most effective and sustainable control.
