= Canine circovirus =

CAC

Virus classification
- (unranked): Virus
- Realm: Floreoviria
- Kingdom: Shotokuvirae
- Phylum: Cressdnaviricota
- Class: Arfiviricetes
- Order: Cirlivirales
- Family: Circoviridae
- Genus: Circovirus
- Species: Circovirus canine

Species of virus

Canine circovirus (CaCV or DogCV), first isolated in 2012, is a small non-enveloped, icosahedral, single-stranded DNA virus that infects domestic dogs and wild canids exclusively. It is a member of the Circoviridae family and the genus Circovirus. There are currently 11 species of known circoviruses that have been identified to affect a wide variety of birds and mammals. As seen with all extensively studied circoviruses, the diameter ranges between approximately 15 and 25 nanometers. The icosahedral triangulation number is 1, the smallest size a viral capsid can be, in which there are a total of 60 protein subunits that make up the capsid. CaCV is not to be confused with canine coronavirus, another diarrhea-causing agent within the family Coronaviridae, or porcine circoviruses which are a members of the same genus as CaCV but only seen in pigs. CaCV (genome 1) was the first Circovirus to be identified that infects a mammal species other than pigs.

== Genome ==
The genome of CaCV is made up of a single circular strand of DNA 2,063 nucleotides in length. DNA in general is made up of four nitrogenous bases: adenine (A), thymine (T), cytosine (C), and guanine (G) in which A pairs with T and G pairs with C across complementary strands in double stranded DNA and occasionally in single stranded DNA with a specific sequence that promotes same-strand base pairing. CaCV exhibits this behavior in the form of stem-loop structures. G-C nucleotide base pairing makes up a little over half of the total pairs that are present in CaCV and the most abundant dinucleotides (when adjacent nucleotides on the same strand bind covalently to each other) observed are T-G and G-G. The genome is made up of two coding and two noncoding sections. There are two open reading frames (ORFs) that code for specific viral replicase and capsid proteins. Viral replicase proteins are made up of 303 amino acids and the viral capsid is constructed out of 270 amino acids. The gene coding for the capsid contains the sequence for 30 arginine amino acids originating from the amino terminus. This unusual stretch is hypothesized to be important for DNA binding. The two intergenic noncoding portions of the genome are made up of 135 and 203 nucleotides. These regions contain distinctive sequences for stemloop structures, in which the single stranded DNA pairs up and a ring is formed at the end, as well as segments of palindromes. There is one noncoding region between the two ORFs that contains a stemloop structure and the sequence TAGTATTAC used for the initiation of genome replication. The origin of replication site (ori) is located within the intergenic region between the two coding regions at the 5’ end. A note about the genome of CaCV is that one of the intergenic noncoding regions shares 91% nucleotide identity with the pine marten torque teno virus from the family Anelloviridae providing evidence of a possible evolutionary relationship between the two viruses.

=== Genome replication ===
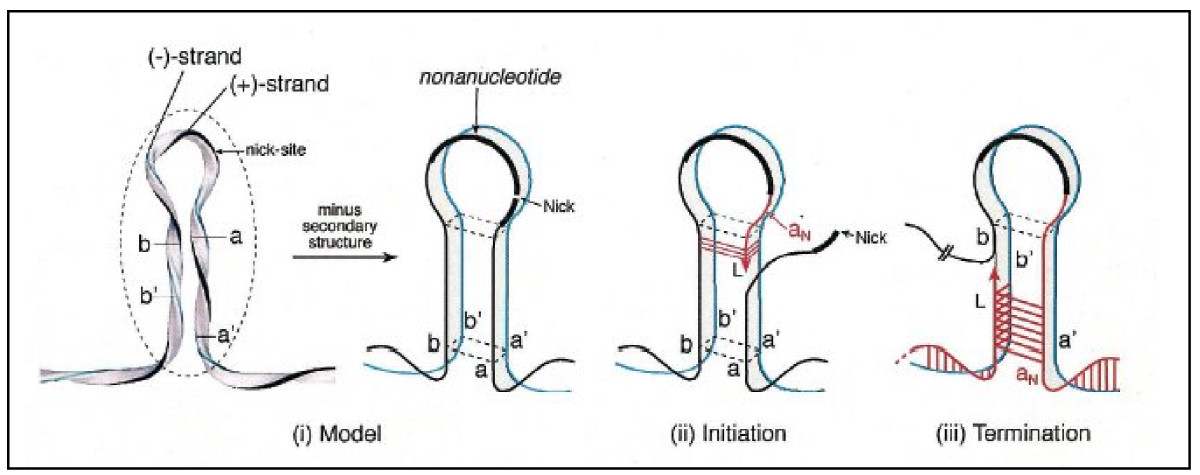
A model of a general circovirus undergoing rolling circle replication, beginning with initiation at a particular nick site and ending at termination once the genome has been replicated in full.

Rolling circle replication is a method for replicating genomes that is seen most commonly in circular plasmids and genomes of bacteria and viruses. The important protein dimer that needs to be coded for in the DNA is the replication protein, Rep. Rep cleaves a location of the DNA exposing a free 3’ OH for viral or cellular polymerase to act on. DNA replication occurs in the nucleus of the cell in which this virus is small enough to enter into.

== Symptoms ==
Circoviruses are generally known to be responsible for potentially fatal illnesses in birds, pigs, bats, dogs, minks, and humans. Dogs with circovirus infection may develop hematochezia, hemorrhagic diarrhea, and increasing vomiting, and possible conditions include ascites, pleural effusion, hypovolemic shock, bicavitary hemorrhage, and disseminated intravascular coagulation. Organs that CaCV DNA has been shown to be present in include the intestines, spleen, lungs, brain, liver, and lymph nodes.

Co-infections are also a common occurrence in animals afflicted with CaCV. Canine distemper and parvovirus (genotype 2) were the most common co-infectors in a group of domestic dogs and other wild canids studied in 2016 by Zaccaria et al. It is also suspected that younger individuals may be more at risk of developing life-threatening symptoms than adult animals, but that claim cannot yet be scientifically made due to sampling bias. A cure for CaCV is currently unknown and treatment is non-specific.

== Case studies ==
In an article published in 2013 by Li et al. a young (1 year) male domestic dog’s liver was analyzed for the presence of an infective agent. The dog was initially brought to the University of California, Davis Veterinary Medical Teaching Hospital because of increasing prevalence of vomiting, diarrhea, and blood in the stool (hematochezia). The dog was eventually euthanized and the owner agreed for postmortem tests to be run. Routine tests for more common infectious agents like parvovirus, coronavirus, and specific types of bacteria were negative. Hemorrhaging throughout the gastrointestinal tract and kidneys were shown along with other histological abnormalities. Liver tissue samples were taken and viral nucleic acids were sequenced which contained specific patterns characteristic of circovirus, giving evidence for CaCV to be the sole cause of death.

In the same paper, fecal matter of a cohort sample of dogs with and without diarrhea was analyzed using real-time PCR techniques to determine the percent prevalence of circovirus. There was not any significant difference between the identification of CaCV DNA in dogs with diarrhea compared to those without, however additional data were found to be interesting. Within the group of dogs that tested positive for CaCV, 68% of them had other co-infections of varying illnesses.

There have been other journal articles that have addressed an apparent relationship between CaCV and other co-infection agents. Thaiwong et al. submitted a publication in 2016 on a dual infection incident of CaCV and canine parvovirus in a breeding colony of dogs. Two disease outbreaks occurred in Michigan in 2013 and 2014 in which a group of related Papillon dogs became ill and some died shortly (within 1 week) after symptoms began to show. The bodies of the dogs that died were accepted for necroscopy. The intestines, spleen, and lymph nodes were most affected with deformities such as segmental mucosal collapse, villar shortening, lymphoid necrosis, lymphocytolysis, multifocal granulomatous inflammation, and histiocytosis. These events led to overall organ failure and production of unusual mucus secretions. PCR analysis and sequencing of the treated organ tissues revealed large amounts of CaCV DNA and canine parvovirus-2 DNA and antigens.

Other studies have mentioned the presence of CaCV in other countries other than the United States. An additional article by Decaro et al. highlights a breakout of enteritis disease in a litter of puppies in Southern Italy. Two dogs died within a week of infection while the others were ill but able to recover. One of the bodies underwent laboratory analysis and necroscopy to determine the infectious agent(s). By using RT-PCR techniques and sequencing, the liver and gut samples tested positive for the presence of the CaCV replicase gene. All other pathogens that were screened for came up negative. Prevalence of CaCV in Taiwan was also studied in which dogs with diarrhea were approximately three times more likely to be infected with CaCV than healthy dogs. This contrasted the study run by Li et al. in the US in which dogs with diarrhea were not more likely to be CaCV positive.
