= Duck circovirus =

Virus classification
- (unranked): Virus
- Realm: Monodnaviria
- Kingdom: Shotokuvirae
- Phylum: Cressdnaviricota
- Class: Arfiviricetes
- Order: Cirlivirales
- Family: Circoviridae
- Genus: Circovirus
- Species: Circovirus duck

Species of virus

Duck circovirus (DuCV) is a type of virus found in ducks. Strains of the virus have predominantly been found in China, though strains have also been isolated from ducks in Germany and the United States.

Duck circovirus is a small nonenveloped virus with a monomeric single-stranded circular DNA genome. DuCV has been clustered in the Circoviridae family genus Circovirus, according to the eighth report of the International Committee on Taxonomy of Viruses.

== Pathogenicity ==
Scientists have studied Duck circovirus by using polymerase chain reaction (PCR)-based methods and dot blot hybridisation (DBH) tests. Infection with DuCV appears to cause growth disorders in ducks as well as eventual immunosuppression due to depletion of lymphatic cells.

== Transmission ==
It was found that ducks between the ages of 40~60 days were more susceptible to Duck circovirus. There was no evidence showing that the DuCV virus was capable of vertical transmission.

== Clinical signs ==
The clinical signs are immunosuppression, stunting in growth, and also feather abnormalities.

== Research ==
The PCR and dot blot hybridization (DBH) test was used in 2006–2007. 742 ducks from 70 duck farms were tested. The overall infection rate was 33.29%. Ducks at 3–4 weeks of age where more susceptible to DuCV virus.

== Type of Ducks Affected ==
Anas platyrhynchos, Cairina moschata, and the American Pekin Duck are the ducks most affected by the DuCV virus. These ducks come from various regions of the world.

== Prevention ==
A vaccine to provide protection against Duck circovirus has not been approved for use, though research to create one has occurred. Experimental DNA vaccines encoding the DuCV capsid protein were found to provide protection in vivo, as well as inactivated vaccines that were tested on Muscovy ducks.
