= Xiang-Jin Meng =

American virologist

- Born: Shandong Province, China
- Education: Binzhou Medical College Wuhan University College of Medicine (Hubei Medica College) Iowa State University, Ames, Iowa
- Occupations: University Distinguished Professor, Virginia Tech
- Awards: Recipient, NIH Merit Award (2024) Fellow, American Association for the Advancement of Science (2022) Member, National Academy of Sciences (2016) Fellow, National Academy of Inventors (2014) Fellow, American Academy of Microbiology (2012)
- Website: https://research.vetmed.vt.edu/labs/faculty-labs/meng-lab.html

Xiang-Jin Meng, also known as X.J. Meng, is a Chinese-born American virologist. He is a university distinguished professor at Virginia Tech. He studies emerging, re-emerging and zoonotic viruses of veterinary and human public health significance. He was elected a member of the National Academy of Sciences in 2016, a Fellow of the National Academy of Inventors in 2014, a Fellow of the American Academy of Microbiology in 2012, and a Fellow of the American Association for the Advancement of Science.

== Early life and education ==
Meng grew up in Gaomi, Shandong Province, China. He originally planned to pursue a career in chemical engineering, but instead he enrolled in Binzhou Medical College in 1980 as a medical student.

Receiving his medical degree in 1985, Meng studied at the Wuhan University College of Medicine (formerly Hubei Medical College) and earned a Master's degree in Microbiology and Immunology. There, he discovered his passion and curiosity for virology, under the supervision of his graduate advisor, Yu Sun, who is an experimental virologist and pathologist. Earning his Master's in 1988, Meng worked as a research fellow for three years at the Shandong Academy of Medical Sciences in Jinan.

In 1991, he was admitted to the interdepartmental Immunobiology graduate program at the Iowa State University. His PhD dissertation focused on an emerging virus, porcine reproductive and respiratory syndrome virus, in the laboratory of Prem S. Paul. After receiving his PhD in Immunobiology, he joined the Laboratory of Infectious Diseases as a John E. Fogarty Visiting Scientist and later as a Senior Staff Fellow in the labs of Suzanne U. Emerson and Robert H. Purcell at the National Institute of Allergy and Infectious Diseases at NIH in Bethesda, Maryland.

== Career and research ==
Meng joined the faculty at Virginia Tech in 1999 as an Assistant Professor of Molecular Virology, and rose to the rank of full professor in 2007. He was named a university distinguished professor in 2013. In July 2020, Meng was appointed as the founding director of the Virginia Tech Center for Emerging, Zoonotic and Arthropod-borne Pathogens (CeZAP). From November 2021 to November 2022, Meng served as Interim Executive Director of the Fralin Life Sciences Institute at Virginia Tech.

His research mainly focuses on understanding the mechanism of virus replication and pathogenesis, defining the mechanisms of cross-species virus infection, and developing effective vaccines against emerging and zoonotic viruses. Meng's group discovered the swine hepatitis E virus from pigs and avian hepatitis E virus from chickens, which eventually lead to the recognition of human hepatitis E as a zoonotic disease. Meng's research also led to the invention of the first U.S. Department of Agriculture fully-license commercial vaccine, currently on the global market, against porcine circovirus type 2 (PCV2) and its associated diseases. Additionally, Meng works on a number of other important viruses including Hepatitis E virus, Porcine Reproductive and Respiratory Syndrome Virus, Torque Teno Sus Virus, and Porcine Epidemic Diarrhea Virus.

Meng has authored and co-authored more than 362 peer-reviewed articles and book chapters, which have been cited for more than 38,685 times with a h-index of 103. He is ranked in the top 1% highly cited scientists in the field of microbiology (1997–2007) by Thomson Scientific's Essential Science Indicators. Meng is an inventor of more than 20 U.S. patent awards on viral vaccines and diagnostics.

== Awards and honors ==
- 2024: Recipient, NIH MERIT Award.
- 2023: Virginia Tech Life Time Achievement Award for Innovation.
- 2022: Elected Fellow of the American Association for the Advancement of Science.
- 2021: Recipient, Charles Valentine Riley Memorial Lecturer Award. Presented by AAAS, World Food Prize and Riley Foundation.
- 2018: The Inaugural Lorraine J. Hoffman Graduate Alumni Award, Iowa State University, Ames, Iowa.
- 2017: State Council of Higher Education for Virginia (SCHEV) Outstanding Faculty Award.
- 2016: Elected member of the National Academy of Sciences.
- 2014: Elected Fellow of the National Academy of Inventors.
- 2013: University Distinguished Professor title, a pre-eminent and life-time title bestowed by the university Board of Visitors.
- 2012: Elected Fellow of the American Academy of Microbiology.
- 2008: Recipient, Honorary Diplomat, American College of Veterinary Microbiologists.
- 2008: Recipient, 2008 Virginia Tech Alumni Award for Research Excellence.
- 2001 and 2007: Recipient, Pfizer Award for Research Excellence.
- 1997: Recipient, NIH Fellows Award for Research Excellence.
- 1996: Recipient, Iowa State University’s Zaffarano Prize for Graduate Student Research Excellence.

== Selected publications ==
- Meng, X.-J.; Paul, P. S.; Halbur, P. G. (1994). "Molecular cloning and nucleotide sequencing of the 3'-terminal genomic RNA of the porcine reproductive and respiratory syndrome virus". Journal of General Virology. 75 (7): 1795–1801. doi:10.1099/0022-1317-75-7-1795.
- Meng, Xiang-Jin; Purcell, Robert H.; Halbur, Patrick G.; Lehman, James R.; Webb, Dale M.; Tsareva, Tatiana S.; Haynes, Joseph S.; Thacker, Brad J.; Emerson, Suzanne U. (1997). "A novel virus in swine is closely related to the human hepatitis e virus". Proceedings of the National Academy of Sciences. 94 (18): 9860–9865. Bibcode:1997PNAS...94.9860M. doi:10.1073/pnas.94.18.9860. PMC 23282. PMID 9275216.
- Meng, Xiang-Jin; Halbur, Patrick G.; Shapiro, Max S.; Govindarajan, Sugantha; Bruna, Jeremy D.; Mushahwar, Isa K.; Purcell, Robert H.; Emerson, Suzanne U. (1998). "Genetic and Experimental Evidence for Cross-Species Infection by Swine Hepatitis e Virus". Journal of Virology. 72 (12): 9714–9721. doi:10.1128/JVI.72.12.9714-9721.1998. PMC 110481. PMID 9811705.
- Fenaux, M.; Opriessnig, T.; Halbur, P. G.; Elvinger, F.; Meng, X. J. (2004). "A Chimeric Porcine Circovirus (PCV) with the Immunogenic Capsid Gene of the Pathogenic PCV Type 2 (PCV2) Cloned into the Genomic Backbone of the Nonpathogenic PCV1 Induces Protective Immunity against PCV2 Infection in Pigs". Journal of Virology. 78 (12): 6297–6303. doi:10.1128/JVI.78.12.6297-6303.2004. PMC 416547.
- Billam, P.; Huang, F. F.; Sun, Z. F.; Pierson, F. W.; Duncan, R. B.; Elvinger, F.; Guenette, D. K.; Toth, T. E.; Meng, X. J. (2005). "Systematic Pathogenesis and Replication of Avian Hepatitis e Virus in Specific-Pathogen-Free Adult Chickens". Journal of Virology. 79 (6): 3429–3437. doi:10.1128/JVI.79.6.3429-3437.2005. PMC 1075698. PMID 15731237.
- Huang, Yao-Wei; Harrall, Kylie K.; Dryman, Barbara A.; Opriessnig, Tanja; Vaughn, Eric M.; Roof, Michael B.; Meng, Xiang-Jin (2012). "Serological Profile of Torque Teno Sus Virus Species 1 (TTSuV1) in Pigs and Antigenic Relationships between Two TTSuV1 Genotypes (1a and 1b), between Two Species (TTSuV1 and -2), and between Porcine and Human Anelloviruses". Journal of Virology. 86 (19): 10628–10639. doi:10.1128/JVI.00176-12. PMC 3457317. PMID 22811540.
- Huang, Yao-Wei; Dickerman, Allan W.; Piñeyro, Pablo; Li, Long; Fang, Li; Kiehne, Ross; Opriessnig, Tanja; Meng, Xiang-Jin (2013). "Origin, Evolution, and Genotyping of Emergent Porcine Epidemic Diarrhea Virus Strains in the United States". mBio. 4 (5) e00737-13. doi:10.1128/mBio.00737-13. PMC 3812708. PMID 24129257.
- Cao, Dianjun; Cao, Qian M.; Subramaniam, Sakthivel; Yugo, Danielle M.; Heffron, C. Lynn; Rogers, Adam J.; Kenney, Scott P.; Tian, Debin; Matzinger, Shannon R.; Overend, Christopher; Catanzaro, Nicholas; Leroith, Tanya; Wang, Heng; Piñeyro, Pablo; Lindstrom, Nicole; Clark-Deener, Sherrie; Yuan, Lijuan; Meng, Xiang-Jin (2017). "Pig model mimicking chronic hepatitis e virus infection in immunocompromised patients to assess immune correlates during chronicity". Proceedings of the National Academy of Sciences. 114 (27): 6914–6923. Bibcode:2017PNAS..114.6914C. doi:10.1073/pnas.1705446114. PMC 5502641. PMID 28630341.
- Sooryanarain, Harini; Heffron, Connie L.; Meng, Xiang-Jin (2020). "The U-Rich Untranslated Region of the Hepatitis e Virus Induces Differential Type I and Type III Interferon Responses in a Host Cell-Dependent Manner". mBio. 11 (1) e03103-19. doi:10.1128/mBio.03103-19. PMC 6960293. PMID 31937650.
