= TTMV =

TTMV refers to:

- Torque teno mini viruses, known as Betatorquevirus
- Torque teno midi virus, also known as transfusion transmitted midi virus and typically abbreviated TTMDV, members of Gammatorquevirus
