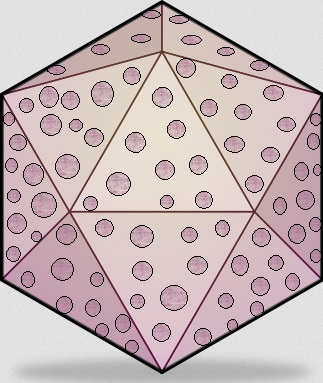
- A model of Chicken anemia virus

Virus classification
- (unranked): Virus
- Realm: Monodnaviria
- Kingdom: Shotokuvirae
- Phylum: Commensaviricota
- Class: Cardeaviricetes
- Order: Sanitavirales
- Family: Anelloviridae
- Genus: Gyrovirus
- Species: Gyrovirus chickenanemia

= Chicken anemia virus =

Chicken anemiavirus

Species of virus

Chicken anemia virus (CAV), scientific name Gyrovirus chickenanemia, is a member of the Anelloviridae family which is found worldwide. The virus only affects chickens. CAV is a non-enveloped icosahedral single-stranded DNA virus, which causes bone marrow atrophy, anemia, and severe immunosuppression. Clinical signs of CAV infection are predominantly found in young chicks due to vertical transmission from the breeder hens whose maternal antibodies have not yet formed following exposure. Clinical disease is rare today because of the widespread practice of vaccinating breeders, but the subclinical form of the disease—which normally affects birds more than two weeks of age following horizontal transmission of the virus via the fecal–oral route—is ubiquitous. The virus is very resistant in the environment, making elimination very difficult.

The disease and virus have many names including chicken anemia, blue wing disease, anemia dermatitis syndrome, chicken/avian infectious anemia, hemorrhagic aplastic anemia syndrome, infectious chicken anemia, chicken infectious anemia virus, and chicken anemia agent. When this virus was first discovered in 1979, it was named chicken anemia agent.

== Clinical signs ==
Clinical signs only occur in chicks less than three weeks of age. During outbreaks of CAV, up to 10% of chicks can die. Signs include a pale comb, wattle, eyelids, legs and carcass, anorexia, weakness, stunting, unthriftiness, weight loss, cyanosis, petechiation and ecchymoses, lethargy, and sudden death. Neurological signs include dullness, depression and paresis.

In older chickens, an infection with no apparent symptoms may cause reduced growth rates due to a poor feed conversion ratio.

== Pathogenesis ==
CAV infects precursor T cells in the thymus and hematopoietic stem cells in the bone marrow, causing destruction of these cells via apoptosis. This reduces the production of red blood cells (RBC) and white blood cells (WBC), leading to severe immunosuppression and anemia.

== Diagnosis ==
A presumptive diagnosis can be made based on the clinical signs and a low hematocrit reading, e.g. below 27%. Virus isolation, increased antibody titres, immunoperoxidase staining, ELISA, PCR or indirect immunofluorescence can be used to confirm the presence of the virus. Post mortem findings show significant atrophy of the lymphoid organs, hemorrhage throughout the tissues, and pale watery bone marrow.

== Treatment and control ==
There is no specific treatment for infected birds. Culling of infected birds is normally performed in infected commercial flocks. Birds that have been infected develop immunity to the virus.

Vertical spread of the disease can be controlled by the vaccination of breeding hens with both live attenuated and wild vaccines. These vaccines reduce the vertical transmission rate. The vaccine has the ATCvet code QI01AD04 (WHO). Appropriate hygiene and biosecurity measures may be employed to control the disease.
