= Cyclovirus =

Virus classification
- (unranked): Virus
- Realm: Monodnaviria
- Kingdom: Shotokuvirae
- Phylum: Cressdnaviricota
- Class: Arfiviricetes
- Order: Cirlivirales
- Family: Circoviridae
- Genus: Cyclovirus

Genus of viruses

Cyclovirus is a genus in the family Circoviridae. The genus contains 90 species. Viruses in this genus have been isolated from dragonflies, as well as chickens, goats, sheep, and other farm animals. Cycloviruses have also been found in the feces of healthy humans and chimpanzees and in samples of cerebrospinal fluid from patients with unexplained paraplegia.

== Species ==
The genus contains the following species, listed by scientific name and followed by the exemplar virus of the species:

- Cyclovirus aasiak, Soft spider associated circular virus 1
- Cyclovirus adie, Chicken associated cyclovirus 1
- Cyclovirus anyidiwo, Army ant associated cyclovirus 2 P8A-4.2_2
- Cyclovirus babka, Dragonfly cyclovirus 6
- Cyclovirus bakri, Goat cyclovirus
- Cyclovirus bashri, Human associated cyclovirus 4
- Cyclovirus bastao, Bat associated cyclovirus 10
- Cyclovirus bohloa, Army ant associated cyclovirus 5 170_4
- Cyclovirus caballo, Horse cyclovirus
- Cyclovirus cervienka, Robinz virus RP_736
- Cyclovirus doi, Bat associated cyclovirus 12
- Cyclovirus enseenene, Army ant associated cyclovirus 8 P1A-reste_2
- Cyclovirus ezzike, Chimpanzee associated cyclovirus 2
- Cyclovirus flagermus, Bat associated cyclovirus 5
- Cyclovirus fledermoyz, Chifec virus UA13_1880
- Cyclovirus foca, Werosea cyclovirus
- Cyclovirus fourmi, Army ant associated cyclovirus 6 P16-reste_1
- Cyclovirus gaaye, Bovine cyclovirus
- Cyclovirus gato, Feline cyclovirus
- Cyclovirus homa, Human associated cyclovirus 5
- Cyclovirus humana, Human associated cyclovirus 10
- Cyclovirus ibimonyo, Army ant associated cyclovirus 3 P1A-reste_4
- Cyclovirus insaan, Human associated cyclovirus 2
- Cyclovirus jaaabani, Bat faeces associated cyclovirus 1
- Cyclovirus jemage, Bat faeces associated cyclovirus 2
- Cyclovirus kacsa, Duck associated cyclovirus 1
- Cyclovirus kemirgen, Dipodfec virus UA23Rod_1805
- Cyclovirus khangkhaw, Bat associated cyclovirus 9
- Cyclovirus kiroptero, Bat faeces associated cyclovirus 3
- Cyclovirus kisikisi, Dragonfly cyclovirus 1
- Cyclovirus kokoro, Army ant associated cyclovirus 1 P21/23-reste_1
- Cyclovirus libelula, Dragonfly cyclovirus 5
- Cyclovirus liepsnele, Robinz virus RP_1170
- Cyclovirus liliac, Bat associated cyclovirus 7
- Cyclovirus liljak, Chifec virus UA15_2320
- Cyclovirus maanav, Human associated cyclovirus 1
- Cyclovirus manitan, Human associated cyclovirus 11
- Cyclovirus manukha, Human associated cyclovirus 3
- Cyclovirus manusyan, Human associated cyclovirus 12
- Cyclovirus mchwa, Arboreal ant associated circular virus 1
- Cyclovirus mier, Army ant associated cyclovirus 4 P8A-3.2_1
- Cyclovirus misi, Calfel virus LSF31_cyc420
- Cyclovirus mmadu, Human associated cyclovirus 6
- Cyclovirus moosa, Calfel virus LSF31_cyc880
- Cyclovirus munthu, Human associated cyclovirus 9
- Cyclovirus murcielago, Bat associated cyclovirus 17
- Cyclovirus muricec, Eumops bonariensis associated cyclovirus 1
- Cyclovirus mutum, Human associated cyclovirus 7
- Cyclovirus mweyba, Mongoose-associated cyclovirus Mon-20
- Cyclovirus naahoohai, Chicken associated cyclovirus 2
- Cyclovirus naastsosi, Mouse associated cyclovirus 1
- Cyclovirus nahkhiir, Bat associated cyclovirus 8
- Cyclovirus namu, Dragonfly cyclovirus 7
- Cyclovirus ndanda, Army ant associated cyclovirus 9 183_1
- Cyclovirus netopyr, Bat associated cyclovirus Vr1
- Cyclovirus newla, Mongoose-associated cyclovirus Mon-32
- Cyclovirus nhanloai, Human associated cyclovirus 8
- Cyclovirus nietoperz, Bat associated cyclovirus 13
- Cyclovirus pauferro, Caesalpinia ferrea associated virus
- Cyclovirus pea, Bat associated cyclovirus 15
- Cyclovirus peka, Bat associated cyclovirus 14
- Cyclovirus pekapeka, Bat associated cyclovirus 16
- Cyclovirus pettirosso, Robinz virus RP_493
- Cyclovirus podgana, Rodent circovirus
- Cyclovirus popo, Bat associated cyclovirus 6
- Cyclovirus popoki, Calfel virus LSF17_cyc102
- Cyclovirus prihor, Robinz virus RP_620
- Cyclovirus prilep, Chifec virus UA15_35
- Cyclovirus punarinta, Robinz virus RP_526
- Cyclovirus rata, Rodent circovirus
- Cyclovirus risi, Squirrel cyclovirus
- Cyclovirus roach, Florida woods cockroach cyclovirus
- Cyclovirus roedor, Capybara associated cyclovirus 1
- Cyclovirus rotte, Dipodfec virus UA04Rod_5913
- Cyclovirus rudzik, Robinz virus RP_584
- Cyclovirus saguza, Chifec virus UA13_1727
- Cyclovirus sawya, Chifec virus UA13_1817
- Cyclovirus sismis, Bat faeces associated cyclovirus 4
- Cyclovirus sokwe, Chimpanzee faeces associated cyclovirus
- Cyclovirus svosve, Army ant associated cyclovirus 7 P4A-reste_1
- Cyclovirus taniilai, Dragonfly cyclovirus 2
- Cyclovirus tarako, Dragonfly cyclovirus 8
- Cyclovirus tonbo, Dragonfly cyclovirus 3
- Cyclovirus totoi, Robinz virus RP_259
- Cyclovirus vauval, Bat associated cyclovirus Cg1
- Cyclovirus vazka, Dragonfly cyclovirus 4
- Cyclovirus vespertilio, Tadarida brasiliensis associated cyclovirus 1
- Cyclovirus vleermuis, Chifec virus UA13_1887
- Cyclovirus yarasa, Bat associated cyclovirus 11
- Cyclovirus ystlum, Chifec virus UA13_1800
