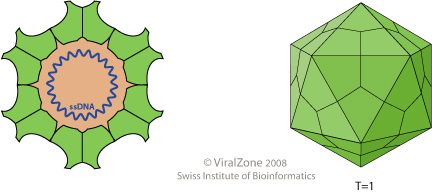

Virus classification
- (unranked): Virus
- Realm: Floreoviria
- Kingdom: Shotokuvirae
- Phylum: Cressdnaviricota
- Class: Arfiviricetes
- Order: Cirlivirales
- Family: Circoviridae
- Genus: Circovirus

= Circovirus =

Genus of viruses

Circovirus is a genus of viruses, in the family Circoviridae. Birds (such as pigeons and ducks) and pigs serve as natural hosts, though dogs have been shown to be infected as well. Circoviruses are single stranded DNA (ssDNA) viruses. There are 70 species in this genus. Some members of this genus cause disease: PCV-1 is non pathogenic, while PCV-2 causes postweaning multisystemic wasting syndrome (PMWS).

== Structure ==
Viruses in Circovirus are non-enveloped, with icosahedral capsids that have T=1 symmetry. The diameter is around 17 nm. Genomes are circular and non-segmented.

The virions of Circoviruses are surprisingly small, with diameters ranging from 17 up to 22 nm.

Genus	Structure	Symmetry	Capsid	Genomic arrangement	Genomic segmentation
Circovirus	Icosahedral	T=1	Non-enveloped	Circular	Monopartite

== Genome ==
Circovirus has a monopartite, circular, and ssDNA genome of between 1759 and 2319nt, making it possibly the virus of shortest genome size in mammal viruses. The virus replicates through an dsDNA intermediate initiated by the Rep protein. Two major genes are transcribed from open reading frame (ORF) 1 and 2. ORF1 encodes Rep and Rep' for initiation of rolling-circle replication; ORF2 encodes Cap, the only structural and most immunogenic protein forming the viral capsid.

== Life cycle ==
Viral replication is nuclear. Entry into the host cell is achieved by penetration. Replication follows the ssDNA rolling circle model. DNA templated transcription, with some alternative splicing mechanism is the method of transcription. The virus exits the host cell by nuclear egress, and nuclear pore export. Birds and pigs serve as the natural host. The virus is known to cause "immunosuppressive conditions" in animals that are infected; as well as having the ability to jump between species, creating difficulty in identifying the origin of infection. Transmission routes are fecal-oral and parental.

Genus	Host details	Tissue tropism	Entry details	Release details	Replication site	Assembly site	Transmission
Circovirus	Birds; pigs	None	Cell receptor endocytosis	Budding	Nucleus	Nucleus	Horizontal; oral-fecal

== Taxonomy ==
The genus contains the following species, listed by scientific name and followed by the exemplar virus of the species:

- Circovirus baizhenhe, White-naped crane circovirus 1
- Circovirus ban, Banfec circovirus 2
- Circovirus barbel, Barbel circovirus
- Circovirus bastao, Bat associated circovirus 4, also called Tadarida brasiliensis circovirus 1
- Circovirus bear, Ursus americanus circovirus
- Circovirus bianfu, Bat associated circovirus 3, also called Rhinolophus ferrumequinum circovirus 1
- Circovirus canary, Canary circovirus
- Circovirus canine, Canine circovirus
- Circovirus catfish, European catfish circovirus, also called Silurus glanis circovirus
- Circovirus chauvesouris, Bat associated circovirus 1
- Circovirus cia, Bat circovirus (BatACV12)
- Circovirus civet, Paguma larvata circovirus
- Circovirus daga, Rodent circovirus (RoACV6)
- Circovirus dever, Bream circovirus 1
- Circovirus duck, Duck circovirus
- Circovirus elk, Elk circovirus
- Circovirus eniyan, Human faeces associated circovirus
- Circovirus finch, Finch circovirus
- Circovirus gloton, Wolvfec circovius
- Circovirus gnaver, Rodent circovirus (RoACV5)
- Circovirus goose, Goose circovirus
- Circovirus gryzon, Bamboo rat circovirus
- Circovirus gull, Gull circovirus
- Circovirus gyurgyalag, Bee-eater circovirus
- Circovirus hirat, Dipodfec virus UA04Rod_4537
- Circovirus human, Human circovirus 1
- Circovirus ialtag, Bat circovirus (BatACV10)
- Circovirus impundu, Chimpanzee faeces associated circovirus
- Circovirus kelawar, Bat associated circovirus 9
- Circovirus kiore, Rodent circovirus
- Circovirus kukwuria, Banfec circovirus 1
- Circovirus lepakko, Bat associated circovirus 7
- Circovirus lin, Equine circovirus 1
- Circovirus magu, Mongoose-associated circovirus Mon-1
- Circovirus mink, Mink circovirus
- Circovirus miztli, Sonfela circovirus 1
- Circovirus miztontli, Sonfela circovirus 2
- Circovirus morcego, Bat associated circovirus 8
- Circovirus mossi, Culex circovirus-like virus
- Circovirus naaleeli, Wigfec circovirus 1
- Circovirus parrot, Beak and feather disease virus
- Circovirus patkany, Brown rat circovirus 1
- Circovirus pato, Wigfec circovirus 2
- Circovirus penguin, Penguin circovirus
- Circovirus pichong, Tick circovirus
- Circovirus pigeon, Pigeon circovirus, also called Columbid circovirus
- Circovirus pipistrello, Bat circovirus (BatACV13)
- Circovirus porcine1, Porcine circovirus 1
- Circovirus porcine2, Porcine circovirus 2
- Circovirus porcine3, Porcine circovirus 3
- Circovirus porcine4, Porcine circovirus 4
- Circovirus python, Black-headed python circovirus 1
- Circovirus ratpenat, Bat associated circovirus 6
- Circovirus raven, Raven circovirus
- Circovirus razbora, Pseudorasbora circovirus 1
- Circovirus roditore, Rodent circovirus (RoACV3)
- Circovirus rongeur, Rodent circovirus (RoACV1)
- Circovirus rosegador, Rodent circovirus (RoACV4)
- Circovirus saguzarra, Bat associated circovirus 5
- Circovirus siksparnis, Bat circovirus (BatACV11)
- Circovirus starling, Starling circovirus
- Circovirus swan, Swan circovirus
- Circovirus tetning, Werosea circovirus
- Circovirus torpegem, Little bittern circovirus
- Circovirus tzinaka, Eumops bonariensis associated circovirus 1
- Circovirus vleermuis, Bat associated circovirus 2
- Circovirus wesa, Calfel virus LSF45_cir359
- Circovirus whale, Beaked whale circovirus
- Circovirus yaa, Avian-like circovirus
- Circovirus zebrafinch, Zebra finch circovirus
