= Iotatorquevirus =

Virus classification
- (unranked): Virus
- Realm: Monodnaviria
- Kingdom: Shotokuvirae
- Phylum: Commensaviricota
- Class: Cardeaviricetes
- Order: Sanitavirales
- Family: Anelloviridae
- Genus: Iotatorquevirus

Species
- Iotatorquevirus suida1a; Iotatorquevirus ursid17

Synonyms
- species Iotatorquevirus suida1a: Iotatorquevirus suida1a ICTV 2022; Torque teno sus virus 1a ICTV 2020; Torque teno sus virus 1a ICTV 2011; Torque teno sus virus 1b ICTV 2011; Torque teno sus virus 1 ICTV 2009; Torque teno sus virus 2 ICTV 2009

Genus of viruses

Iotatorquevirus is a genus of viruses in the family Anelloviridae, in group II in the Baltimore classification. The genus has two species: Iotatorquevirus suida1a and Iotatorquevirus ursid17.

== Virology ==
The virions are small and non-enveloped.

The viruses are usually acquired soon after birth and may invade virtually any tissue in the body.

They are widespread in the pig population.

== Genome ==
Iotatorqueviruses have a circular, single-stranded DNA genome. The genome is negative-sense.

== Clinical ==
Postweaning multisystemic wasting syndrome has been causally associated with porcine circovirus type 2. The Iotatorquevirus have also been linked with this syndrome but a causative role—if one exists—has yet to be established.
