= Lambdatorquevirus =

Virus classification
- (unranked): Virus
- Realm: Monodnaviria
- Kingdom: Shotokuvirae
- Phylum: Commensaviricota
- Class: Cardeaviricetes
- Order: Sanitavirales
- Family: Anelloviridae
- Genus: Lambdatorquevirus

Genus of viruses

Lambdatorquevirus is a genus of viruses, in the family Anelloviridae. Sea lions serve as natural hosts. There are five species in this genus.

== Taxonomy ==
The genus contains the following species:

- Lambdatorquevirus phoci1
- Lambdatorquevirus phoci2
- Lambdatorquevirus phoci3
- Lambdatorquevirus phoci5
- Lambdatorquevirus phoci6

== Structure ==
Viruses in Lambdatorquevirus are non-enveloped, with icosahedral geometries, and T=1 symmetry. The diameter is around 19-27 nm. Genomes are circular, around 2.1kb in length. The genome has 2 open reading frames.

Genus	Structure	Symmetry	Capsid	Genomic arrangement	Genomic segmentation
Lambdatorquevirus	Icosahedral	T=1	Non-enveloped	Circular	Monopartite

== Life cycle ==
Viral replication is nuclear. Entry into the host cell is achieved by penetration into the host cell. Replication follows the ssDNA rolling circle model. DNA-templated transcription, with some alternative splicing mechanism is the method of transcription. The virus exits the host cell by nuclear pore export. Sea lions serve as the natural host.

Genus	Host details	Tissue tropism	Entry details	Release details	Replication site	Assembly site	Transmission
Lambdatorquevirus	Sea lions	None	Cell receptor endocytosis	Budding	Nucleus	Nucleus	Vertical; horizontal
