= Gyrovirus =

Virus classification
- (unranked): Virus
- Realm: Floreoviria
- Kingdom: Shotokuvirae
- Phylum: Commensaviricota
- Class: Cardeaviricetes
- Order: Sanitavirales
- Family: Anelloviridae
- Genus: Gyrovirus

Genus of viruses

Gyrovirus is a genus of viruses, in the family Anelloviridae. Until 2011, chicken anemia virus was the only gyrovirus identified, but since then gyroviruses have also been identified in humans. Diseases associated with this genus include: chicken infectious anemia, which is associated with depletion of cortical thymocytes and erythroblastoid cells.

== Taxonomy ==
The genus contains the following species:

- Gyrovirus anas1
- Gyrovirus anas2
- Gyrovirus chauna1
- Gyrovirus chickenanemia (Chicken anemia virus)
- Gyrovirus fulgla1
- Gyrovirus galga1
- Gyrovirus galga2
- Gyrovirus homsa1
- Gyrovirus homsa2
- Gyrovirus homsa3
- Gyrovirus homsa4
- Gyrovirus hydho1
- Gyrovirus myferr1
- Gyrovirus phaco1

== Structure ==
Gyroviruses have an average size of 19 to 27 nanometers. They are nonenveloped and have an icosahedral capsid with T=1 symmetry. The unique, single protein, trumpet-shaped capsomeres of Gyrovirus are arranged into 12 pentomers yielding a capsid 60 units in size. The genome is circular, non-segmented, and 2290–2320 nucleotides long.

Genus	Structure	Symmetry	Capsid	Genomic arrangement	Genomic segmentation
Gyrovirus	Icosahedral	T=1	Non-enveloped	Circular	Monopartite

== Genome ==
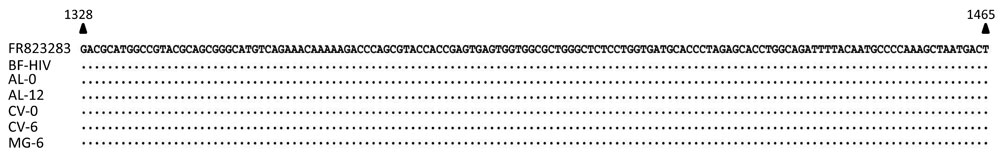
Alignment of the nucleotide sequences of the human gyrovirus genome on the basis of a 138-bp segment (nt 1328–1465) of the viral protein 1 gene. The sequences of the isolate from France (FR823283) and of the 6 isolates found in this http://wwwnc.cdc.gov/eid/article/18/6/12-0179_article.htm study are shown. Nucleotide positions are according to isolate FR823283 (1). Hyphens indicate identity with the prototype sequence of isolate FR823283 (1).

The Gyrovirus genome consists of negative sense, single-stranded, circular, DNA. The genome is relatively small at 2,300 nucleotides. and contains three overlapping open reading frames that code for only three known proteins.

== Proteins ==
The Gyrovirus genome codes for a single polysistronic mRNA that subsequently codes for three proteins, VP1, VP2, and VP3. VP1 is the 51kd capsid protein; in addition to its structural function, it also contains motifs for rolling circle replication in the C-terminal region. VP2 is a 23kd nonstructural protein with phosphatase activity. Virions with mutations in SP2 are still replication competent; however, their cytopathic effects were highly attenuated. VP3, also called apoptin, is a 13kd protein that has been shown to independently induce apoptosis in chicken cells. Apoptin is also being researched for its ability to induce apoptosis in human tumor cells.

== Replication strategy ==
Viral replication is nuclear. Entry into the host cell is achieved by penetration into the host cell. Upon entering the host cell, the virus converts from single stranded to double stranded, circular DNA using host cell machinery. The circular dsDNA is then used as a template for transcription and for replication via a rolling circle mechanism similar to phiX174. DNA-templated transcription, with some alternative splicing mechanism is the method of transcription. The virus exits the host cell by nuclear egress, and nuclear pore export. Birds serve as the natural host. Transmission routes are fecal-oral, parental, egg transmission, and respiratory.

Genus	Host details	Tissue tropism	Entry details	Release details	Replication site	Assembly site	Transmission
Gyrovirus	Birds	Chicken: Thymocytes, erythrobalstoid cells; Egg: embryonal tissues and eggshell membrane	Cell receptor endocytosis	Budding	Nucleus	Nucleus	Horizontal: oral-fecal; vertical: bird to egg

== Chicken anemia virus ==
Chicken anemia virus (CAV) was, until 2011, the only member of genus Gyrovirus identified. It causes disease worldwide in areas where chickens are produced. CAV causes severe anemia, hemorrhaging, and depletion of lymphoid tissue through the destruction of bone marrow erythroblastoid cells. The disease affects mainly young chicks not protected by maternal antibodies. Age resistance to disease begins at about one week, but can be overcome however by coinfection with immunosuppressive diseases, such as bursal disease virus, Marek’s disease, and others.

A second virus in this genus—Avian gyrovirus 2—has been described. The viral genome shares ~40% of its sequence with Chicken anemia virus (CAV). The genome is 2383 nucleotides long and has three partially overlapping open reading frames encoding the proteins VP1, VP2 and VP3. These proteins share 38.8%, 40.3%, and 32.2% amino acid identities between their homologs in the CAV.

Two species have been described from humans—human gyrovirus and human gyrovirus 3. Human gyrovirus 1 appears to be the same virus as avian gyrovirus 2. A fourth gyrovirus—gyrovirus 4 (GyV4)—has been isolated from human stool and chicken meat.
