= Kappatorquevirus =

Virus classification
- (unranked): Virus
- Realm: Monodnaviria
- Kingdom: Shotokuvirae
- Phylum: Commensaviricota
- Class: Cardeaviricetes
- Order: Sanitavirales
- Family: Anelloviridae
- Genus: Kappatorquevirus

Species
- Kappatorquevirus suidak2a; Kappatorquevirus suidak2b

Synonyms
- species Kappatorquevirus suidak2a: Kappatorquevirus suidak2a ICTV 2022; Torque teno sus virus k2a ICTV 2015; Torque teno sus virus k2 ICTV 2011; species Kappatorquevirus suidak2b: Kappatorquevirus suidak2b ICTV 2022; Torque teno sus virus k2b ICTV 2015

Genus of viruses

Kappatorquevirus is a genus of viruses, in the family Anelloviridae. Pigs serve as natural hosts. There are two species in this genus. Diseases associated with this genus include: possibly post-weaning multisystemic wasting syndrome (PMWS).

== Structure ==
Viruses in Kappatorquevirus are non-enveloped, with icosahedral geometries, and T=1 symmetry. The diameter is around 19-27 nm. Genomes are circular, around 2.7kb in length. The genome codes for 4 proteins, and has 3 open reading frames.

Genus	Structure	Symmetry	Capsid	Genomic arrangement	Genomic segmentation
Kappatorquevirus	Icosahedral	T=1	Non-enveloped	Circular	Monopartite

== Life cycle ==
Viral replication is nuclear. Entry into the host cell is achieved by penetration into the host cell. Replication follows the ssDNA rolling circle model. DNA-templated transcription, with some alternative splicing mechanism is the method of transcription. The virus exits the host cell by nuclear pore export. Pigs serve as the natural host. Transmission routes are parental.

Genus	Host details	Tissue tropism	Entry details	Release details	Replication site	Assembly site	Transmission
Kappatorquevirus	Pigs	None	Cell receptor endocytosis	Budding	Nucleus	Nucleus	Vertical; horizontal
