= Alphatorquevirus =

Virus classification
- (unranked): Virus
- Realm: Floreoviria
- Kingdom: Shotokuvirae
- Phylum: Commensaviricota
- Class: Cardeaviricetes
- Order: Sanitavirales
- Family: Anelloviridae
- Genus: Alphatorquevirus

Genus of viruses

Alphatorquevirus is a genus of viruses in the family Anelloviridae, in group II in the Baltimore classification. It encompasses numerous species of the virus known as TTV (transfusion-transmitted virus), torque teno virus, SENV (senior virus), SANBAN, and various other names. The genus contains 26 species.

== Taxonomy ==
The genus contains the following species:

- Alphatorquevirus cerco1
- Alphatorquevirus cerco2
- Alphatorquevirus cerco3
- Alphatorquevirus cerco5
- Alphatorquevirus cerco6
- Alphatorquevirus cerco7
- Alphatorquevirus homin1
- Alphatorquevirus homin2
- Alphatorquevirus homin3
- Alphatorquevirus homin4
- Alphatorquevirus homin5
- Alphatorquevirus homin6
- Alphatorquevirus homin7
- Alphatorquevirus homin9
- Alphatorquevirus homin10
- Alphatorquevirus homin13
- Alphatorquevirus homin14
- Alphatorquevirus homin15
- Alphatorquevirus homin17
- Alphatorquevirus homin18
- Alphatorquevirus homin19
- Alphatorquevirus homin20
- Alphatorquevirus homin21
- Alphatorquevirus homin24
- Alphatorquevirus homin29
- Alphatorquevirus homin31

== History ==
TTV was first reported in a Japanese patient in 1997 by the research scientist T. Nishizawa. The virus is extremely common, even in healthy individuals—as much as 100% prevalent in some countries, and in approximately 10% of blood donors in the UK and the US. Although it does not appear to cause symptoms of hepatitis on its own, it is often found in patients with liver disease. For the most part, TTV infection is believed to be asymptomatic.

Initially found in Japanese patients with hepatitis of unknown cause, TTV was detected in various populations without proven pathology, including blood donors. This new virus was initially discovered in 1997 by means of representational difference analysis (RDA) in the plasma of a Japanese patient (initials T.T.) with posttransfusion hepatitis. A sequence (N22) of 500 nucleotides (nt) was first characterized and further extended to about 3700 nt (TA278 clone). At that time, sequence analysis suggested that TTV was related to the Parvoviridae family. At the end of 1998, two independent studies demonstrated the presence of an additional GC-rich region of about 120 nt which led to the discovery of the circular nature of the TTV genome (~3800 nt). This finding established the relationship of TTV with the Circoviridae family.

== Etymology ==
Initially the virus was named TTV after a patient with T.T. initials. Later the name torque (necklace) teno (from Latin tenuis - "thin") virus was adopted as it preserved the original abbreviation.

== Viral spread ==
The large number of epidemiological studies permitted to clearly point out the global distribution of the virus (Africa, North and South America, Asia, Europe, Oceania) in rural and urban populations. Despite that the link between TTV infection and a given pathology has not been shown, the hypothesis of a relation between viral load and the immune status of the host was suggested. Moreover, although initially suspected to be transmitted only by blood transfusion, the global dispersion of the virus in populations and its detection in various biologic samples (plasma, saliva, feces, etc...) suggest combined modes of diffusion, and in particular the spread by saliva droplets. Sexual transmission has also been proposed.

Related viruses have been found in chimpanzees, apes, African monkeys, tupaias, chickens, pigs, cows, sheep and dogs.

Vertical transmission has been reported in pigs.

== Genome ==
TTV's genome is a negative sense, circular single-stranded piece of DNA, approximately 3.8 kb in length; it is a non-enveloped virus with a virion of about 40 nm in diameter. While bearing some similarity to members of the group Circoviridae, it lacks sequence homology with any known viruses. It is classified under the family Anelloviridae.

Its genome contains 2 large open reading frames, encoding 770 and 202 amino acids, as well as several smaller ORFs. The genomic region -154/-76 contains a critical promoter.

Isolates have been classified into five main clades numbered 1 to 5. TTV genogroup 3 also includes the 8 virus strains known as SENV-A to H.

== Clinical ==
These viruses are not currently believed to cause disease in humans. Infection with these viruses tends to lead to lifelong viraemia and their possible association with disease remains under investigation. Higher than usual viral loads have been associated with severe idiopathic inflammatory myopathies, cancer and lupus.

Examination of faecal samples in 135 Brazilians with gastroenteritis showed evidence of the virus in 121 (91%). The presence of multiple genotypes was common.

The presence of this virus in acute lung injury and exacerbations of idiopathic lung fibrosis has been reported.

Increased viral loads in cases of congenital mannose-binding lectin deficiencies have been reported.

A possible case of aplastic anaemia with hepatitis has been reported.

One case of post-transplant hepatitis has been reported.

An association with head/neck cancer has been proposed.

TTV viral loads have been shown to increase in patients with immunosuppression. Increased levels of TTV have been observed, for example, in sepsis.

Since TTV is ubiquitous, and viral replication correlates with immune status, TTV has been studied as a promising marker to assess global functional immune competence in transplant recipients.

== Replication ==
Not much is known about TTV's replication, however based on animal circoviral studies, a double strand replication structure appears necessary. Some studies have described the presence of double strand TTV DNA in various tissues and organs suggesting an active replication in these localizations. These findings also minimize the hypothetic implication of TTV in hepatic disorders. No other data are at the present time available for TLMV (TTV-like Mini Virus – the strain infecting humans).
