= Zetatorquevirus =

Virus classification
- (unranked): Virus
- Realm: Floreoviria
- Kingdom: Shotokuvirae
- Phylum: Commensaviricota
- Class: Cardeaviricetes
- Order: Sanitavirales
- Family: Anelloviridae
- Genus: Zetatorquevirus

Genus of viruses

Zetatorquevirus is a genus in the family of Anelloviridae, in group II in the Baltimore classification. It has a single species, Zetatorquevirus aotid1.
