= Deltatorquevirus =

Virus classification
- (unranked): Virus
- Realm: Monodnaviria
- Kingdom: Shotokuvirae
- Phylum: Commensaviricota
- Class: Cardeaviricetes
- Order: Sanitavirales
- Family: Anelloviridae
- Genus: Deltatorquevirus

Genus of viruses

Deltatorquevirus is a genus of viruses in the family Anelloviridae, in group II in the Baltimore classification. It has a single species, Torque teno tupaia virus (Deltatorquevirus tupai1).
