= Etatorquevirus =

Virus classification
- (unranked): Virus
- Realm: Monodnaviria
- Kingdom: Shotokuvirae
- Phylum: Commensaviricota
- Class: Cardeaviricetes
- Order: Sanitavirales
- Family: Anelloviridae
- Genus: Etatorquevirus

Genus of viruses

Etatorquevirus is a genus of viruses in the family Anelloviridae, in group II in the Baltimore classification. It includes 18 species.

== Taxonomy ==
The genus contains the following species:

- Etatorquevirus felid1
- Etatorquevirus felid2
- Etatorquevirus felid3
- Etatorquevirus felid4
- Etatorquevirus felid5
- Etatorquevirus felid17
- Etatorquevirus felid18
- Etatorquevirus felid19
- Etatorquevirus felid20
- Etatorquevirus felid21
- Etatorquevirus felid22
- Etatorquevirus felid24
- Etatorquevirus felid25
- Etatorquevirus felid26
- Etatorquevirus felid27
- Etatorquevirus felid28
- Etatorquevirus felid35
- Etatorquevirus viver3
