= Gammatorquevirus =

Virus classification
- (unranked): Virus
- Realm: Monodnaviria
- Kingdom: Shotokuvirae
- Phylum: Commensaviricota
- Class: Cardeaviricetes
- Order: Sanitavirales
- Family: Anelloviridae
- Genus: Gammatorquevirus

Genus of viruses

Gammatorquevirus is a genus of viruses in the family Anelloviridae, in group II in the Baltimore classification. It contains 15 species. The fifteen species are all commonly called "torque teno midi virus" (TTMDV), number 1–15.

== Taxonomy ==
The genus contains the following species:

- Gammatorquevirus homidi1
- Gammatorquevirus homidi2
- Gammatorquevirus homidi3
- Gammatorquevirus homidi4
- Gammatorquevirus homidi5
- Gammatorquevirus homidi6
- Gammatorquevirus homidi7
- Gammatorquevirus homidi8
- Gammatorquevirus homidi9
- Gammatorquevirus homidi10
- Gammatorquevirus homidi11
- Gammatorquevirus homidi12
- Gammatorquevirus homidi13
- Gammatorquevirus homidi14
- Gammatorquevirus homidi15

== Discovery ==
TTMDV, which stands for transfusion transmitted midi virus or torque teno midi virus was first isolated in 2005 from patients with an acute viral infection syndrome.

Because of the circular nature of its DNA genome, TTMDV (which was provisionally named small anellovirus 1) was classified as an anellovirus. Genomic analysis confirmed this classification.

Like other anelloviruses, TTMDV is quite common, even in healthy individuals. It has been found in various bodily fluids, including saliva and nasopharyngeal aspirates.

== Genome and capsid ==
Like other members of its family, TTMDV's genome is a circular single-stranded piece of DNA of a negative polarity. The genome is approximately 3.2 kb in length, which is slightly smaller than that of TTV and slightly larger than that of TTMV. It is a non-enveloped virus with a capsid about 40 nm in diameter. The capsid possesses T=1 icosahedral symmetry.

== Clinical ==
The pathogenic effects of TTMDV in humans is not known. However, it has been isolated from diarrhea cases.
