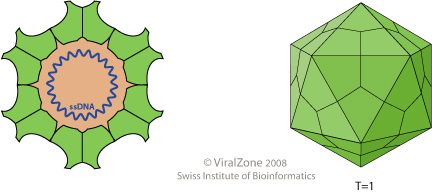

Scientific classification
- (unranked): Virus
- Realm: Monodnaviria
- Kingdom: Shotokuvirae
- Phylum: Cressdnaviricota
- Class: Arfiviricetes
- Order: Cirlivirales
- Family: Circoviridae
- Genus: Circovirus

Groups included
- Circovirus porcine1 (Porcine circovirus 1); Circovirus porcine2 (Porcine circovirus 2); Circovirus porcine3 (Porcine circovirus 3); Circovirus porcine4 (Porcine circovirus 4)

Cladistically included but traditionally excluded taxa
- All other circoviruses

= Porcine circovirus =

Species of virus

Porcine circovirus (PCV) is a group of four single-stranded DNA viruses that are non-enveloped with an unsegmented circular genome. They are members of the genus Circovirus that can infect pigs. The viral capsid is icosahedral and approximately 17 nm in diameter.

PCVs are the smallest viruses replicating autonomously in eukaryotic cells. They replicate in the nucleus of infected cells, using the host polymerase for genome amplification.

PCV-2 causes Porcine circovirus associated disease or postweaning multisystemic wasting syndrome (PMWS). An effective vaccination is now available. Fort Dodge Animal Health (Wyeth) launched the first USDA approved vaccine in 2006, containing an inactivated virus (ATCvet code: QI09AA07 (WHO)).

== Classification ==
Three strains of PCV are known as of 2018:

- PCV-1 (first identified in 1974) readily infects, but is not known to cause disease in swine.
- PCV-2 (first isolated in 1997) causes PMWS, which over time results in significant depletion of lymphocytes; postmortem examination of diseased animals reveals enlarged lymph nodes and abnormal lung tissue. However, viral infection by itself tends to cause only mild disease, and co-factors such as other infections or immunostimulation seem necessary for development of severe disease. For example, concurrent infection with porcine parvovirus or PRRS virus, or immunostimulation lead to increased replication of PCV-2 and more severe disease in PCV-2-infected pigs.
- PCV-3 (first described in 2015) causes a wide range of problems, and may be widespread among pigs.

PCV-1 and PCV-2 show a high degree of sequence identity and a similar genomic organisation; nevertheless, the basis of the distinct pathogenicity has not yet been unravelled. The organization for PCV-3 is similar, but the sequence identity is much lower.

== Genome ==
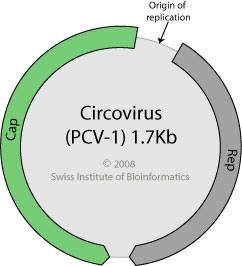
Genome map of PCV-1 (identical with PCV-2)

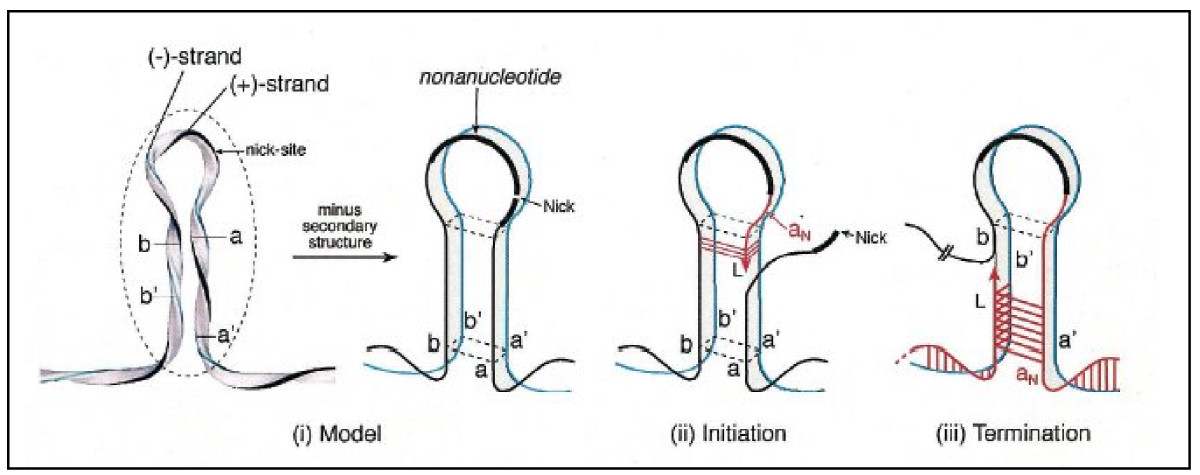
”Melting Pot” quadruplet formation

PCV's genome is one of the simplest of all viruses, requiring only a capsid protein (ORF2) and two replicase proteins (ORF1) in order to replicate and produce a functional virus. Due to the simplicity of PCV, it must rely heavily on the host's cellular machinery to replicate. The origin of replication is located on a small octanucleotide stem-loop that is flanked by palindromic repeats, with the ORFs being located head-to-head on both sides of the Ori. Specifically, ORF1 is located clockwise and ORF2 is located counterclockwise of the Ori.

The two replicase enzymes that are created from ORF1, Rep and Rep', are conserved between the two types of PCV, and are part of the early phase of the virus. The replicases differ in that Rep is the full ORF1 transcript of 312 amino acids, whereas Rep' is a truncated form of ORF1 as a result of splicing and is only 168 amino acids in length. The promoter for rep (Prep) contains an Interferon-Stimulated Response Element (ISRE) that suggests Rep and Rep' are regulated by cytokine involvement, and is probably a means for the virus to overcome the host's immune responses to infection. Rep and Rep' form a dimer that binds to two hexameric regions adjacent to the stem-loop, H1 and H2, which is required for replication. When the dimer binds to this region, the replicases cleave the loop region of the stem-loop and remain covalently bound to the H1 and H2 regions of the DNA, which becomes the 5' end of the DNA. The newly formed 3'OH end forms a primer using host RNA polymerase, which is then used by the host's DNA polymerase to begin transcription of the viral DNA via rolling circle replication. After the complementary DNA strand has been created, the stem region of the stem-loop forms a loose, non-hydrogen bonded, quadruplet DNA structure. This loosely associated structure can form short lived DNA-trimers which forms two templates for replication, as well as maintaining the nucleic integrity of the stem region of the stem-loop. The termination of the replication sequence has not been identified, yet, though there is evidence supporting that Rep also represses its own promoter, Prep.

The ORF2 region encodes the capsid protein Cap (aka CP), which differs slightly between PCV-1 and PCV-2. This variation within PCV may explain why PCV-1 is non-pathogenic, while PCV-2 is pathogenic. The promoter for this protein is located within ORF1, within the site where Rep' is truncated, and is splice from the same exon to the starting point of the ORF2 coding region and expressed during both early and late phases. This is the immunogenic region of the virus and is the primary area of research for creating a vaccine to treat PMWS.

There is a third gene encoded in the opposite orientation to ORF1 in the genome. This gene is transcribed and is an essential gene involved in viral replication.

=== Size ===
Porcine circovirus is a replicating entity with one of the smallest DNA strands consisting of a simple loop of DNA.

The DNA sequence for Porcine circovirus type 2 strain MLP-22 is 1726 base pairs long.

== Entry ==
PCV infects a wide variety of cell types, including hepatocytes, cardiomyocytes, and macrophages. However, until recently, it was unknown exactly how attachment and entry into these cells was achieved. Research has shown that PCV utilizes clathrin-mediated endocytosis to enter the cell, though it's speculated that there may still be other factors that haven't been identified. Once endocytosed, the endosome and lysosome formation causes an acidic pH shift, which allows ATP-driven uncoating of the virus and allows it to escape the endosomes and lysosomes. After the virus escapes the endosomes and lysosomes, it travels to the nucleus through unknown means.

== Escape ==
Besides ORF1 and ORF2, there is also an ORF3 which is not necessarily required for PCV to survive within the host. Research has shown that the protein coded in ORF3 can modulate the host cell's cell-division cycle and cause cell-mediated, virus-induced apoptosis. Using a yeast two-hybrid screening system of ORF3 against the porcine cDNA library indicated that the ORF3 protein interacts with the porcine pPirh2, which is an E3 ubiquitin ligase. This E3 ubiquitin ligase normally interacts with p53 during the cell division cycle and prevents it from halting the cell division cycle at S-phase. However, ORF3 also interacts with pPirh2 at the same region as p53 and causes an upregulation of p53 expression. This increase in p53 stops the cell division cycle and the result of this is p53 mediated apoptosis, which releases PCV into the extracellular environment.

== Contamination in human vaccine ==
On March 22, 2010, the U.S. Food and Drug Administration (FDA) recommended suspending the use of Rotarix, one of two vaccines licensed in the United States against rotavirus, due to findings of viral DNA contamination. Follow-up work by GlaxoSmithKline confirmed the contamination in working cells and the viral "seed" used in Rotarix production, also confirming the material was likely present since the early stages of product development, including the clinical trials for FDA approval.

Testing of the other licensed vaccine against rotavirus infection, RotaTeq, also detected some components of both PCV-1 and PCV-2. Porcine circovirus 1 is not known to cause disease in humans or other animals.

As of June 8, 2010, the FDA has, based on a careful review of a variety of scientific information, determined it is appropriate for clinicians and public health professionals in the United States to use both Rotarix and RotaTeq vaccine.

== See also ==
- Animal virology
