= Thetatorquevirus =

Virus classification
- (unranked): Virus
- Realm: Monodnaviria
- Kingdom: Shotokuvirae
- Phylum: Commensaviricota
- Class: Cardeaviricetes
- Order: Sanitavirales
- Family: Anelloviridae
- Genus: Thetatorquevirus

Genus of viruses

Thetatorquevirus is a genus in the family of Anelloviridae, in group II in the Baltimore classification. The genus contains nine species.

== Taxonomy ==
The genus contains the following species:

- Thetatorquevirus muste1
- Thetatorquevirus procy5
- Thetatorquevirus procy6
- Thetatorquevirus ursid1
- Thetatorquevirus ursid2
- Thetatorquevirus ursid3
- Thetatorquevirus ursid4
- Thetatorquevirus ursid14
- Thetatorquevirus ursid15
