= Betatorquevirus =

Virus classification
- (unranked): Virus
- Realm: Floreoviria
- Kingdom: Shotokuvirae
- Phylum: Commensaviricota
- Class: Cardeaviricetes
- Order: Sanitavirales
- Family: Anelloviridae
- Genus: Betatorquevirus

Genus of viruses

Betatorquevirus is a genus of viruses in the family Anelloviridae, in group II in the Baltimore classification. The genus Betatorquevirus includes all "torque teno mini viruses" (TTMV), numbered from 1 to 38.

== Taxonomy ==
The genus contains the following species:

- Betatorquevirus homini1
- Betatorquevirus homini2
- Betatorquevirus homini3
- Betatorquevirus homini4
- Betatorquevirus homini5
- Betatorquevirus homini6
- Betatorquevirus homini7
- Betatorquevirus homini8
- Betatorquevirus homini9
- Betatorquevirus homini10
- Betatorquevirus homini11
- Betatorquevirus homini12
- Betatorquevirus homini13
- Betatorquevirus homini14
- Betatorquevirus homini15
- Betatorquevirus homini16
- Betatorquevirus homini17
- Betatorquevirus homini18
- Betatorquevirus homini19
- Betatorquevirus homini20
- Betatorquevirus homini21
- Betatorquevirus homini22
- Betatorquevirus homini23
- Betatorquevirus homini24
- Betatorquevirus homini25
- Betatorquevirus homini26
- Betatorquevirus homini27
- Betatorquevirus homini28
- Betatorquevirus homini29
- Betatorquevirus homini30
- Betatorquevirus homini31
- Betatorquevirus homini32
- Betatorquevirus homini33
- Betatorquevirus homini34
- Betatorquevirus homini35
- Betatorquevirus homini36
- Betatorquevirus homini37
- Betatorquevirus homini38

== Initial discovery ==
The discovery of TTMV, like the original Torque Teno virus (TTV) isolate, was accidental. After TTV was isolated in 1997 from a Japanese patient, primers were created to study TTV in more detail. TTV-specific primers used in PCR of human plasma samples yielded sequences that partially matched that of TTV, but were noticeably shorter. TTV was eventually understood to have a genome of 3.6–3.9 kb, while TTMV has a genome of 2.8–2.9 kb. Another TT-like virus later isolated in 2007, Torque teno midi virus or TTMDV, has a genome of 3.2 kb.

== Genome and capsid ==
TTMV shares similar morphologic features with the other human anelloviruses. The capsid has a T=1 icosahedral symmetry. The virion does not have a lipid envelope and is thus "naked", making it an extremely simple virus. It is estimated that the virion is a little less than 30 nm in diameter.

The genome is circular and made of single-stranded DNA of negative polarity. It is 2.86–2.91 kilobases long. Anelloviruses are known for having 3 or 4 overlapping, nested open reading frames; TTMV has 3 ORF's that overlap. ORF-2 and ORF-3 overlap with ORF-1 at opposite ends. For TTMV, ORF-1 is about 663 residues and ORF-2 is about 91 residues long. There is a highly conserved 130-nt region just downstream of the TATA box.

== Phylogeny & spread ==
TTMV is highly divergent. The first phylogenetic tree created from TTMV genomic sequences revealed a large cluster of strains; ORF-1 had divergences of over 42% at the nucleotide level and over 67% at the amino acid level.

TTMV is also highly prevalent, like other human anelloviruses. Subsequent research after it was discovered has yielded the prevalence of TTMV DNA among blood donors to be 48%–72%. It can likely infect a wide range of tissues, as it has been isolated from various body fluids and tissues, including saliva, feces, plasma/serum, PBMCs, bone marrow, spleen, pancreas, kidneys, nervous tissue, lymph nodes, semen, and cervical swabs. Its exact transmission mechanism is unknown, but is thought to be possible by blood-borne, sexual, fecal-oral, and respiratory routes.

Recent studies have shown that humans can have multiple infections of TT viruses.

== Clinical ==
Though TTVs are potentially associated with diseases and their pathogenicity has been debated since their discovery, TTMV is not currently known as an explicit cause of any human disease. TTMV has been isolated from a number of parapneumonic empyema. However, its clinical significance remains unclear.
