= Porcine circovirus associated disease =

Porcine circovirus 2

Virus classification
- (unranked): Virus
- Realm: Floreoviria
- Kingdom: Shotokuvirae
- Phylum: Cressdnaviricota
- Class: Arfiviricetes
- Order: Cirlivirales
- Family: Circoviridae
- Genus: Circovirus
- Species: Porcine circovirus 2

Species of virus and its corresponding disease

Porcine circoviral disease (PCVD), also known as porcine circovirus associated disease (PCVAD), is a disease seen in domestic pigs. This disease causes illness in piglets, with clinical signs including progressive loss of body condition, visibly enlarged lymph nodes, difficulty in breathing, and sometimes diarrhea, pale skin, and jaundice. PCVD is very damaging to the pig-producing industry and has been reported worldwide. PCVD is caused by Porcine circovirus 2 (PCV-2).

The North American industry endorses "PCVAD" and European use "PCVD" to describe this disease.

== PMWS and PCV-2 ==
Postweaning multisystemic wasting syndrome (PMWS) is the classic PCVD entity, caused by PCV-2. PCV-2 has a near universal distribution – present in most pig herds. In contrast, PMWS is more sporadic in its distribution. Experimental induction of PMWS has not been achieved by PCV-2 infection alone, using infectious DNA clones of the virus or a pure form of PCV-2 derived from infectious DNA clones. Therefore, it is assumed that PMWS is a multifactorial disease. PCV-2 is necessary but not sufficient for the development of PMWS. However, viral infection by itself tends to cause only mild disease, and co-factors such as other infections or immunostimulation seem necessary for development of severe disease.[1] For example, concurrent infection with porcine parvovirus or PRRS virus, or immunostimulation lead to increased replication of PCV-2 and more severe disease in PCV-2-infected pigs. There is no significant correlation of the disease with virus sequence variation with affected and control pigs. Porcine circovirus type 1 (PCV1) was first identified in 1974 and was recognized as a non-disease-causing agent that frequently occurred in laboratory tissue cultures.

== Clinical signs ==
Both PMWS and porcine dermatitis and nephropathy syndrome (PDNS) are associated to PCV-2. Many pigs affected by the circovirus also seem to develop secondary bacterial infections, like Glässer disease (Haemophilus parasuis), pulmonary pasteurellosis, colibacillosis, salmonellosis and others. Postmortem lesions occur in multiple organs, especially in lymphoid tissues and lung, giving rise to the term "multisystemic". Lesions may also affect the skin, kidney, reproductive tissue, brain, or blood vessels.

Wasting pigs is the most common sign of PMWS infection, increasing the mortality rate significantly.

== Management practices to decrease severity of PMWS ==
François Madec, a French author, has written many recommendations on how reduce PMWS symptoms. They are mostly measures for disinfection, management, and hygiene, referred to as the "20 Madec Points" [Madec & Waddilove, 2002].

These measures have recently been expanded upon by Dr. David Barcellos, a professor at the Veterinary College in the Universidade Federal do Rio Grande do Sul, Rio Grande do Sul, Brazil. He presented these points at "1st Universidade Federal do Rio Grande do Sul Symposium about swine management, reproduction, and hygiene".

He divided his points by pig growth stage, and they can be loosely summarized as:

- keep the gutters clean
- increase feeder space
- use pens or small cages with solid dividers
- avoid mixing pigs from different origins
- improve the quality of air
- decrease maximum capacity, giving each pig more room
- separate sick animals as soon as possible, and treat them in a hospital pen. If they do not respond to antibiotics in three days, they should be culled
- control access of people and other animals
- reduce environmental stress factors such as gases and air currents
- use immunizations and preventive medications for secondary agents commonly associated with PMWS

== See also ==
- Animal viruses
- Dermatitis
- Nephropathy
