= Circoviridae =

Virus classification
- (unranked): Virus
- Realm: Monodnaviria
- Kingdom: Shotokuvirae
- Phylum: Cressdnaviricota
- Class: Arfiviricetes
- Order: Cirlivirales
- Family: Circoviridae

Genera
- Circovirus; Cyclovirus

Family of viruses

Circoviridae is a family of DNA viruses. Birds and mammals serve as natural hosts. The family has two genera. Diseases associated with this family include: PCV-2: postweaning multisystemic wasting syndrome; CAV: chicken infectious anemia.

== Structure ==
Viruses in the family Circoviridae are non-enveloped, with icosahedral and round geometries, and T=1 symmetry. The diameter is around 20 nm. Genomes are circular and non-segmented, around 3.8kb in length. The capsid consists of 12 pentagonal trumpet-shaped pentamers. There are two main open reading frames arranged in opposite directions that encode the replication and capsid proteins.

Genus	Structure	Symmetry	Capsid	Genomic arrangement	Genomic segmentation
Cyclovirus	Icosahedral	T=1	Non-enveloped	Circular	Monopartite
Circovirus	Icosahedral	T=1	Non-enveloped	Circular	Monopartite

== Life cycle ==
Viral replication is nuclear. Entry into the host cell is achieved by penetration into the host cell. Replication follows the ssDNA rolling circle model. DNA templated transcription, with some alternative splicing mechanism is the method of transcription. The virus exits the host cell by nuclear egress, and nuclear pore export. A stem loop structure with a conserved nonanucleotide motif is located at the 5' intergenic region of circovirus genomes and is thought to initiate rolling-cycle replication. Birds and mammals serve as the natural host. Transmission routes are fecal-oral.

Genus	Host	Tissue tropism	Entry	Release	Replication site	Assembly site	Transmission
Cyclovirus	Birds	Chicken: Thymocytes, erythrobalstoid cells; Egg: embryonal tissues and eggshell membrane	Cell receptor endocytosis	Budding	Nucleus	Nucleus	Horizontal: oral-fecal; vertical: bird to egg
Circovirus	Birds; pigs	None	Cell receptor endocytosis	Budding	Nucleus	Nucleus	Horizontal; oral-fecal

== Taxonomy ==
The family Circoviridae contains two genera—Circovirus and Cyclovirus.

== Clinical ==
A cyclovirus—cyclovirus-Vietnam—has been isolated from the cerebrospinal fluid of 25 Vietnamese patients with CNS infections of unknown aetiology. The same virus has been isolated from the faeces of healthy children and also from pigs and chickens. This suggests an orofaecal route of transmission with a possible animal reservoir.

== See also ==
- Animal viruses
