= Cirlivirales =

Virus classification
- (unranked): Virus
- Realm: Monodnaviria
- Kingdom: Shotokuvirae
- Phylum: Cressdnaviricota
- Class: Arfiviricetes
- Order: Cirlivirales

Order of viruses

Cirlivirales is an order of viruses.

== Taxonomy ==
Cirlivirales contains the following families:

- Circoviridae
- Endolinaviridae
- Vilyaviridae
