= List of countries with KFC franchises =

World map of KFC outlets Former locations Current locations Current locations, only on US military bases

This is a list of countries with KFC franchises.

As of early 2026, there are at least 31,980 KFC outlets in 150 countries and territories in the world. 10,000 of those stores are in China alone. The first KFC franchise opened in the United States in 1952. The first overseas franchise was established in the United Kingdom in May 1965. A large number of Caribbean and developed Western markets entered by the early 1970s. This was followed by expansion throughout the Middle East and developed Asian markets from the mid-1970s and into the 1980s. China was entered in 1987. Expansions were made into most of Europe and South America in the early 1990s. The most recent area of expansion is Africa, where the company is targeting the continent's growing middle class.

The major markets for KFC include United States, Canada, Japan, India, South Africa, United Kingdom, Thailand, Malaysia, Indonesia, Australia, and China.

The global operations are overseen by Yum International, which is headquartered in Louisville, Kentucky. Yum! typically grant a master franchise to a local operator, or take a stake in a joint venture between such a company and itself. In 11 countries, Yum! International manages KFC directly, including China, Russia and India. Worldwide, major franchise holders range from large local conglomerates such as Jardines and Doosan Group, to companies specifically established to run restaurants franchises, such as AmRest and even investment firms such as the Carlyle Group. In Malaysia and Indonesia, the major franchise holders are publicly listed companies. On the other hand, in smaller markets such as some Caribbean islands, the franchises may be operated by a single individual.

== Current markets ==
=== Africa ===
Country/region	Year entered	Outlets	First outlet	Owner/major operator	Notes
Algeria	2024	5	Algiers	Azadea Group	KFC opened in Algeria on April 14, 2024, but it was closed by local authorities two days later, because of Algerians protesting against KFC and supporting Palestine as part of the Israeli boycott. However, it opened again without the company logo, and a new outlet opened in the City Center mall in Algiers.
Angola	2012	9	Maianga, Luanda	Grupo Ibersol	
Botswana	1992	16	Gaborone	Baobab Energy Botswana	
Egypt	1973	164	Cairo	Americana Group	
Eswatini	1993	10	Mbabane	KFC Africa	
Gabon	2019	5	Libreville	Resto Group	
Ghana	2011	34	Greater Accra	Mohinani Group	
Ivory Coast	2018	6	Abidjan, Marcory	Vivo Energy	
Kenya	2011	39	Nairobi	Kuku Foods East Africa	
Lesotho	2012–2023; 2023	8	Maseru	KFC Baobab Lesotho (Pty) Ltd	
Madagascar	2019	3	Antananarivo	Pick n Eat Ltd	The first and only Western and international fast food chain to open in the country.
Malawi	2012	3	Blantyre	Afribrand Limited	
Mauritius	1983	22	Curepipe	Food & Allied Group	
Morocco	2001	39	Casablanca	Americana Group	
Mozambique	2007	12	Maputo	Grupo Ibersol	
Namibia	1992	22		Baobab Energy Namibia	
Nigeria	2009	24	Lagos	Devyani International Nigeria Limited	
Réunion	2021	5	Le Port	Ricardo Lartin	
Rwanda	2020–2025; 2026	1	Kigali	Kuku Foods East Africa	Opened on February 7, 2020, but closed and demolished its first outlet in December 2025. returned on April 1, 2026.
Senegal	2019	3	Dakar	Sedima Group	
South Africa	1971	1,200	Johannesburg	KFC Africa	Divested its holdings from 1987 until 1994 to holding company Devco, after U.S. Congress passed a law forbidding U.S. companies from owning South African assets, due to apartheid. At present, 90% of SA locations are franchised, and 10% are company-owned. KFCSA is South Africa's largest fast food chain by number of outlets, and as of 2023, South Africa is KFC's fifth-largest country by number of locations.
Sudan	2019-2023; 2025	8	Khartoum	Araak Group	All outlets were shut down in 2023 due to the ongoing Sudanese Civil War. Returned in July 2025.
Tanzania	2013	9	Dar es Salaam	Kuku Foods East Africa	
Tunisia	2018	11	Tunis	HBG group	
Uganda	2013	23	Kampala	Kuku Foods East Africa	
Zambia	2011	7			
Zimbabwe	1991–2008, 2014	10		Country Bird Holdings	KFC left the country in 2008 after the franchise holder failed to meet Yum!'s standards. Reopened in July 2014.

==== Gallery ====
The following is a gallery of KFC outlets in African countries.
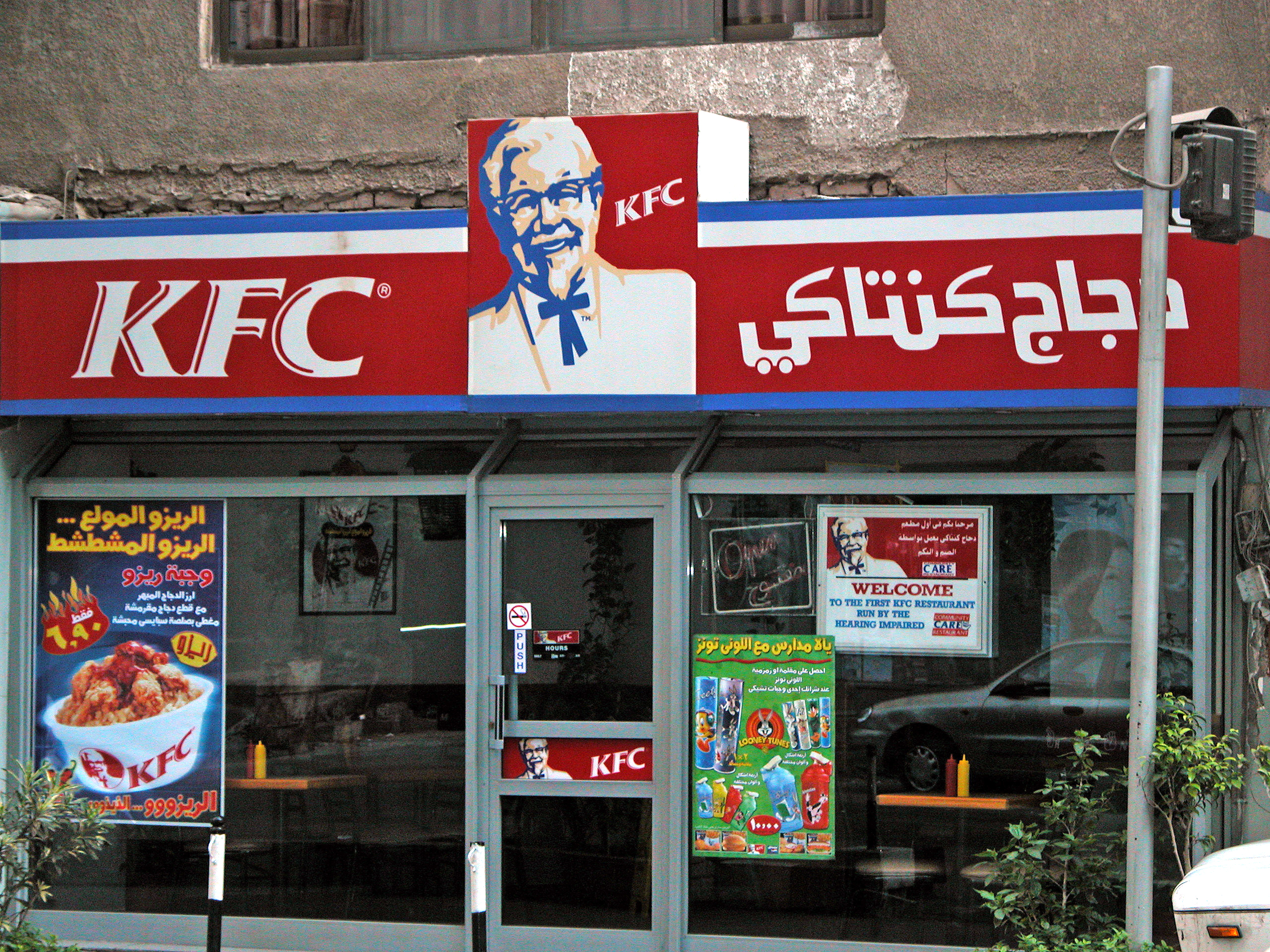
A KFC restaurant in Cairo, Egypt

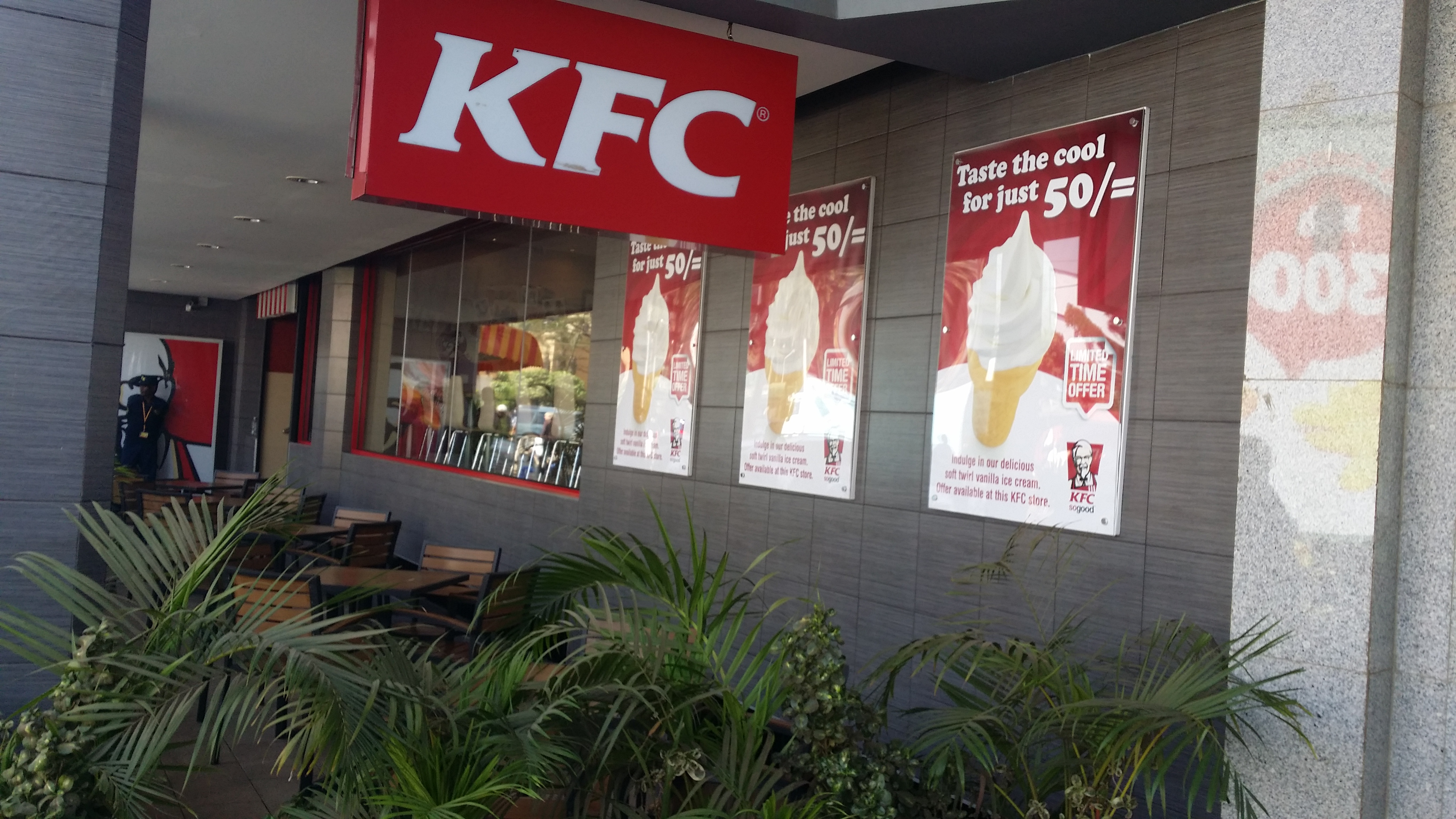
A KFC outlet in Nairobi, Kenya

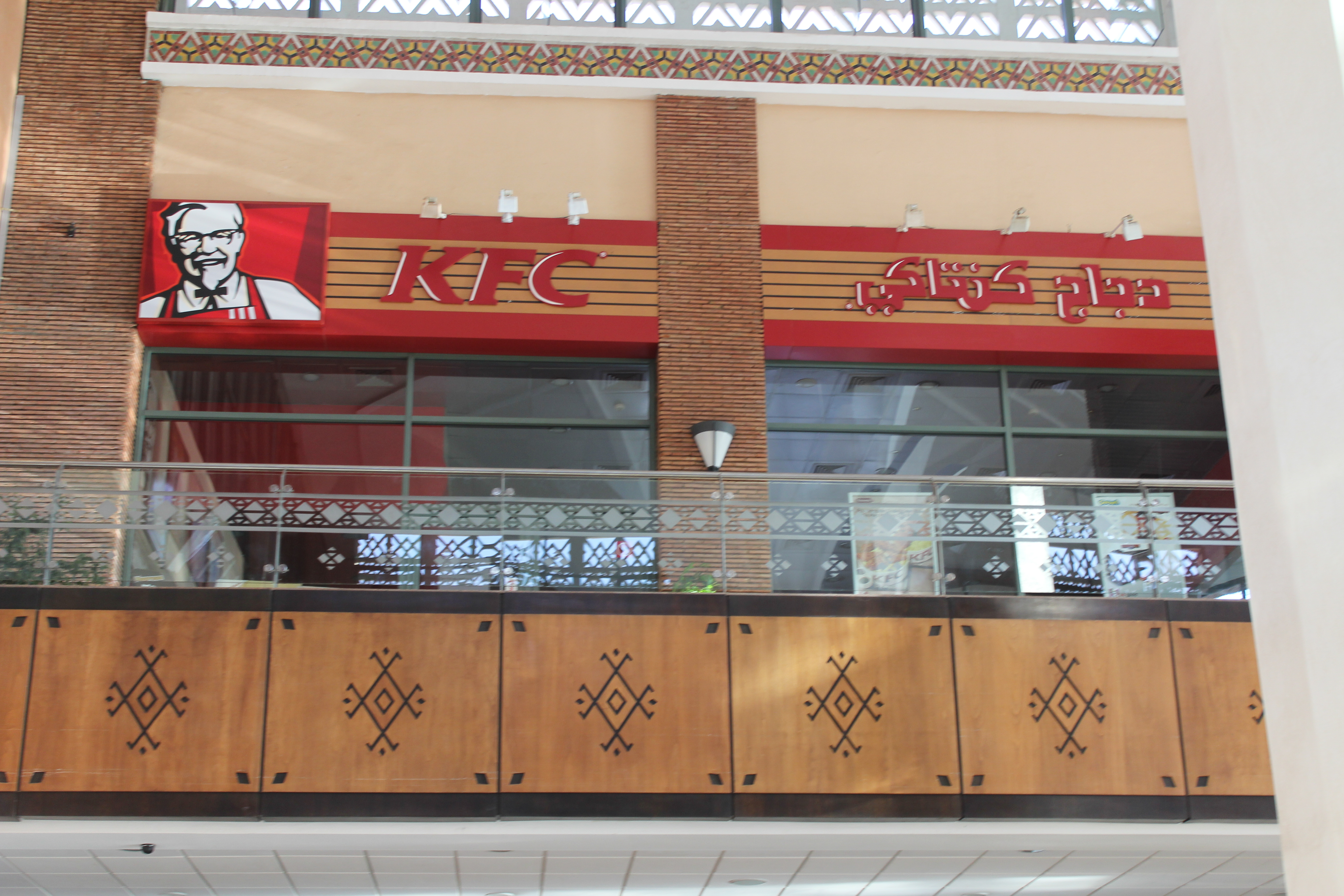
A KFC restaurant in a railway station in Marrakesh, Morocco

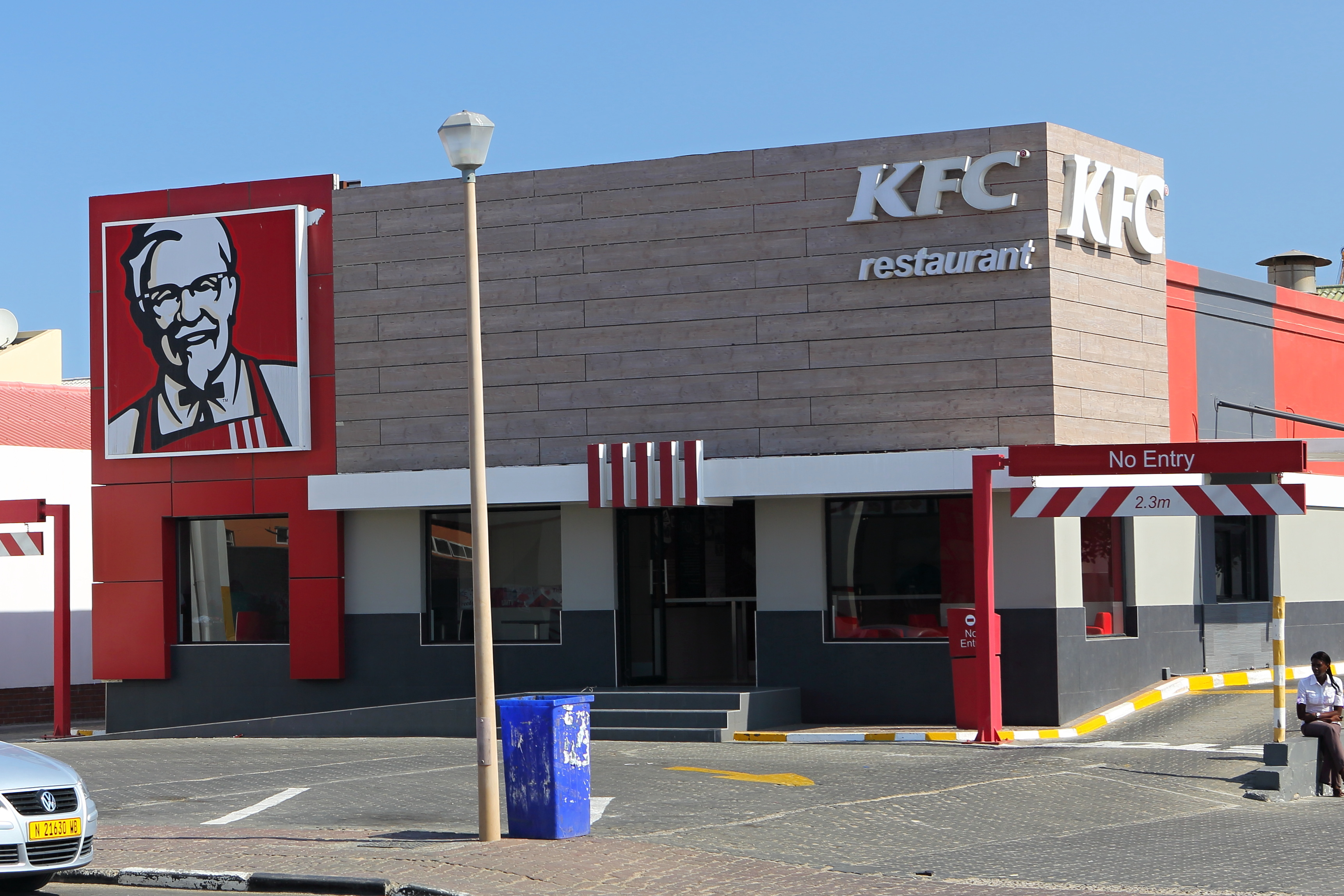
A KFC restaurant with a drive thru in Walvis Bay, Namibia

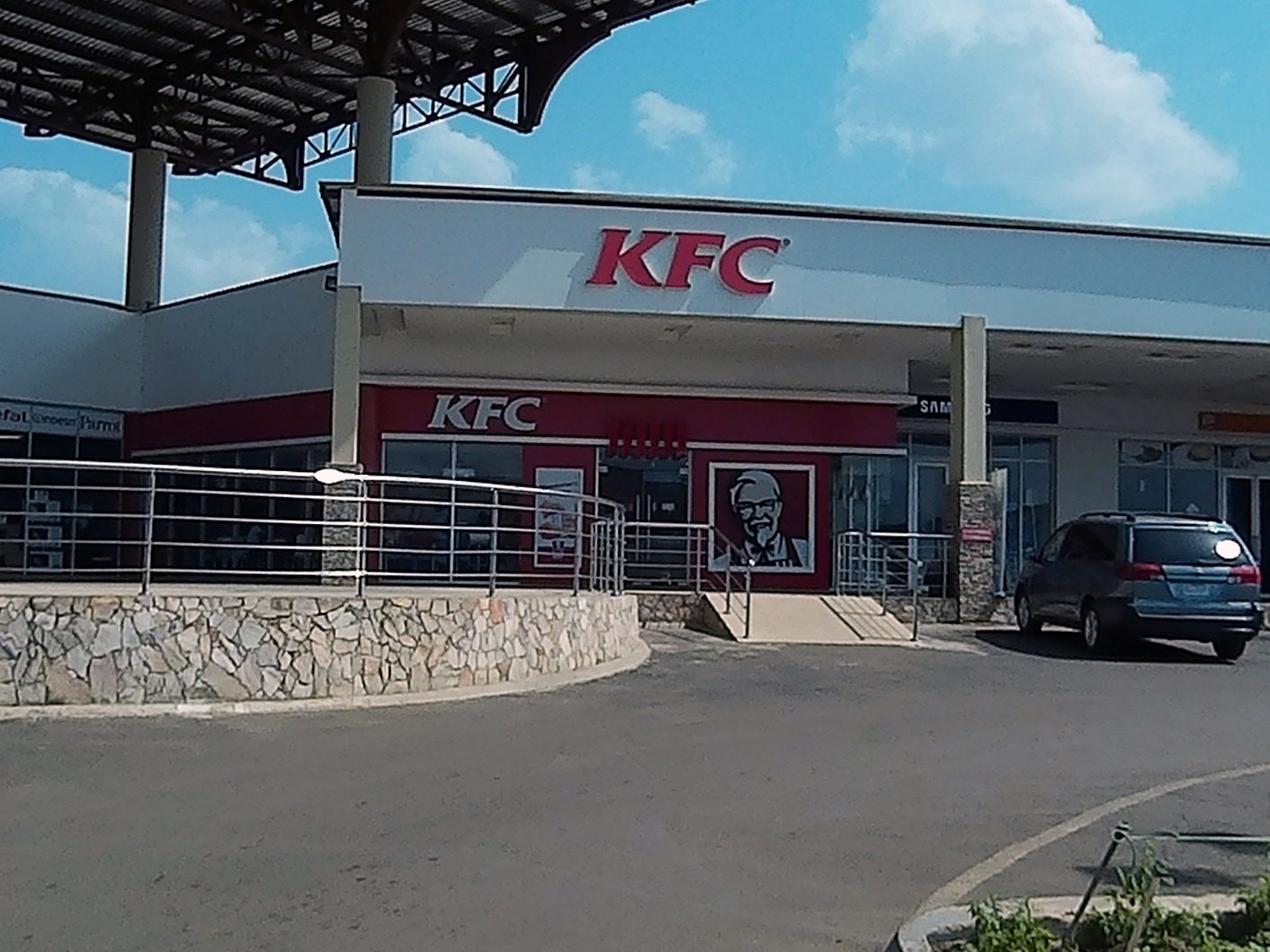
A KFC restaurant in Ilorin, Nigeria

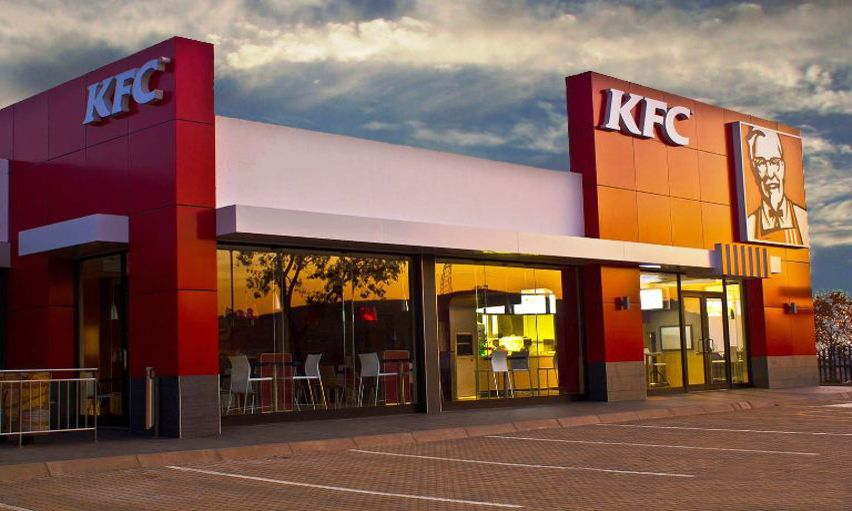
A KFC drive thru restaurant in Pretoria, South Africa

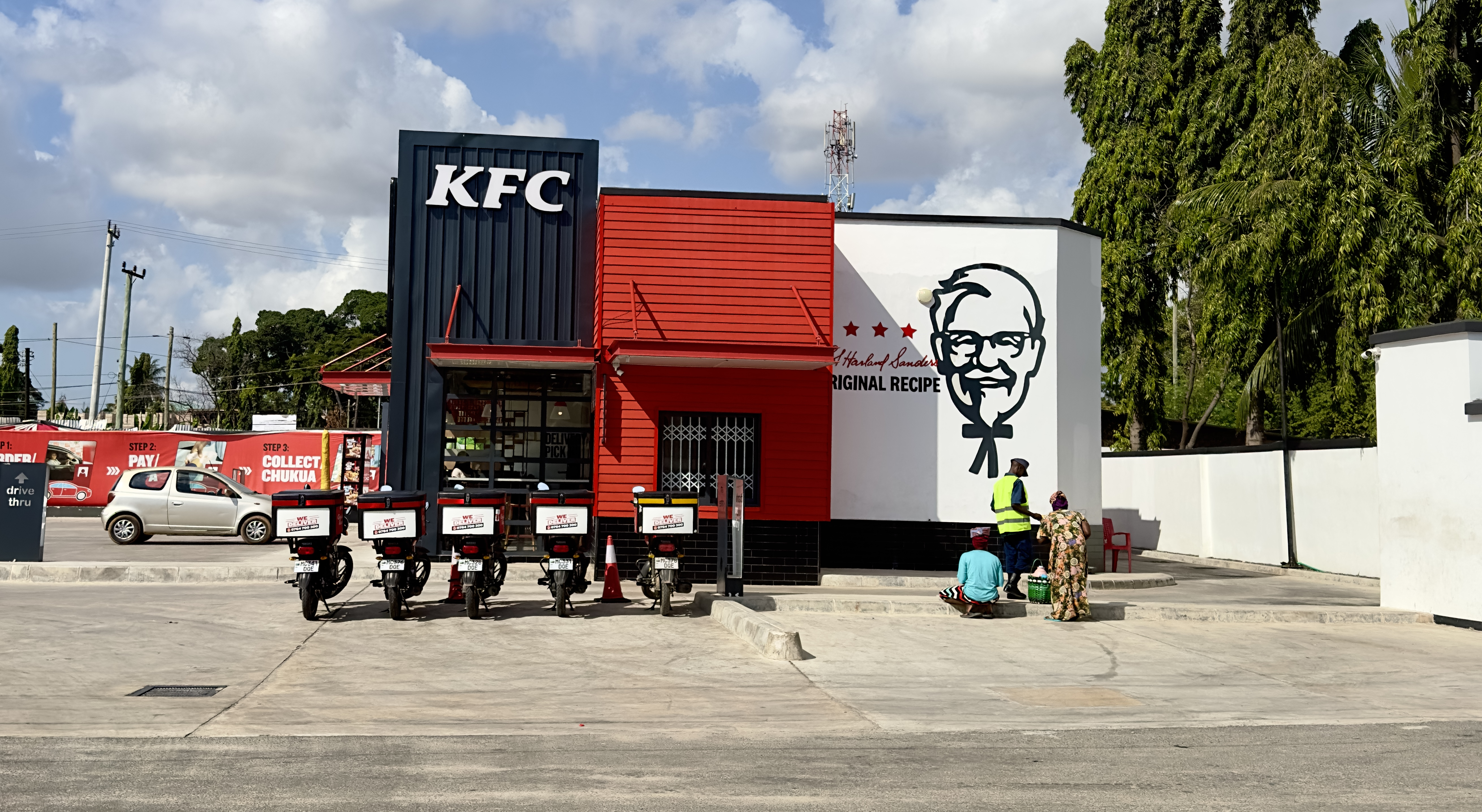
A KFC restaurant in Mwananyamala, Tanzania

=== Asia ===
Country/region	Year entered	Owner/major operator	Notes
Azerbaijan	2011	GFC Ltd	31 outlets. In October 2012, the world's largest KFC opened in Baku. The 1,600-square-meter outlet, with a seating capacity of 300, is housed in the city's Sabunçu rail station built in 1926. AFK Ltd reportedly invested 3 million euros to restore the nearly destroyed building.
Bahrain	1973	Americana Group	24 outlets.
Bangladesh	2006	Transcom Group	47 outlets as of 2025. First outlet opened at Gulshan in 2006.
Brunei	1980	QSR Brands (M) Holdings Sdn Bhd	17 outlets, first outlet was opened in Bandar Seri Begawan. Also the first possible foreign fast food chain in Brunei, hence the possible opening year being 1980.
China	1987	Yum China	12,600 outlets in over 2,500 cities as of September 2025. KFC's largest market. The first Kentucky Fried Chicken outlet opened on Qianmen Street in downtown Beijing on November 12, 1987.
Cambodia	2008	The Royal Group and QSR Brands (M) Holdings Sdn Bhd	13 outlets as of 2024. Established in March 2008. KFC is one of Royal Group of Companies Ltd (The Royal Group) business, a partnership with the Malaysian QSR brands and Rightlink Corporation. The Royal Group is one of the largest conglomerates in Cambodia with substantial investments in media, telecommunications, banking, education, property development and trading.
Hong Kong	1973–1975, 1985	Birdland Ltd	75 outlets. KFC was the first American fast food chain to enter Hong Kong in 1973, with an outlet in Mei Foo Sun Chuen. There were 11 outlets by mid-1974, but by September 1974 many outlets had closed. The remaining 4 outlets were closed in February 1975. KFC misjudged the local market and failed to develop a suitable business model, with its takeout only stores failing to catch on. Chickens imported from China were fed fishmeal, which ruined the taste. The chain was reintroduced by Swire Group in September 1985, with an outlet opened on Jordan Road, at a cost of $3 million. A second outlet was opened on Causeway Bay in 1986. By 1995 there were 17 outlets. Sold to Birdland in 1997.
India	1995	Sapphire Foods Ltd; Devyani International Ltd	1,000 outlets. KFC's first outlet in India was a two-storey outlet on Brigade Road in Bangalore opened in June 1995.
Indonesia	1979	PT Fastfood Indonesia	690 outlets. First outlet in Jalan Melawai, Jakarta. Listed on the Jakarta Stock Exchange. It is currently owned by PT Indoritel Makmur Internasional, which also owns Indomaret. See KFC Indonesia
Iraq	2023	Americana Group	20 outlets. Americana Group opened the first restaurant in Baghdad at Family Mall; seven outlets can be found in Erbil, one outlet can be found in Sulaymaniyah, one outlet in Duhok and ten outlets in Baghdad
Israel	1993–2014, 2020	Mefco Smart Service	19 outlets. First restaurant opened in Nazareth.
Japan	1970	KFC Holdings Japan, Ltd (Carlyle Group)	1,131 outlets. First outlet opened in Nagoya.
Jordan	1984	Americana Group	27 outlets.
Kazakhstan	2007	Americana Group	70 outlets as of 2022. The first restaurant was opened in Almaty in 2007.
Kuwait	1973	Americana Group	66 outlets. Americana Group opened the first KFC outlet in Kuwait in 1973 marking the brand's debut in the Middle East. In the years that followed, Americana Group expanded the brand's presence across the Middle East and North Africa region.
Kyrgyzstan	2017	?	20 outlets as of 2024; 17 are in Bishkek, while three are in Osh.
Lebanon	1973	Shaban Brothers Ltd	23 outlets. KFC master franchisees from 1973 to 1993.
Macau	c. 1989	?	5 outlets, first outlet in Rosa Buena Street, Coloane.
Malaysia	1973–1992, 2004	QSR Brands (M) Holdings Sdn Bhd	770 outlets. Kentucky Nuggets was conceived in Malaysia and then found its way to KFC worldwide. Today, Kentucky Nuggets is one of KFC's successes. KFC led the chained fast food market in 2011, with 45 percent of value sales. The first KFC outlet was opened in 1973 on Jalan Tuanku Abdul Rahman.
Maldives	2018	Sapphire Foods	Formerly 3 outlets, now only one in Velana International Airport.
Mongolia	2013	Tavan Bogd Group	12 outlets. The first Western and international fast food chain to open in the country. Opened its first outlet in Ulaanbaatar on May 29, 2013.
Myanmar	2015	Yoma Strategic Holdings	36 outlets as of 2024. First outlet open in Yangon on June 30, 2015.
Nepal	2009	Devyani International	32 outlets: 15 in Kathmandu, at DurbarMargh, Boudha, Thimi, Maharajgunj, Labim Mall, BlueBird mall, Kalanki, Tripureshwar; one in Itahari, one in Bharatpur, one in Hetauda, and one in Lakeside Pokhara.
Oman	1986	Americana Group	36 outlets.
Pakistan	1997	Delicious Holdings	152 outlets as of March 2026. First opened in Gulshan-e-Iqbal in Karachi in 1997.
Palestine	2011	ACRFF	15 outlets. First branch opened September 10, 2011, at Plaza Mall in Ramallah. 9 outlets including 3 in Ramallah.
Philippines	1967	RAMCAR Group	332 outlets. In June 1994, Manuel U. Agustines obtained the sole franchise over the sale and distribution of KFC products in the Philippines, under the corporate name of Quick Service Restaurants (QSR) Corporation.
Qatar	1976	Americana Group	39 outlets.
Saudi Arabia	1975	Americana Group	220 outlets.
Singapore	1977	QSR Brands (M) Holdings Sdn Bhd	84 outlets. First outlet opened on Somerset Road in 1977. 40 stores by 1992, when it was acquired by KFC International. In 2002, KFC Singapore was acquired by KFC (Malaysia) Holdings Bhd. 86 outlets in 2012. All Singaporean KFC locations are certified halal.
South Korea	1984	Orchestra Private Equity	190 outlets. KFC Korea had a good startoff in the beginning, but experienced a decline in the mid-2000s. Opening its first store in 1984 in Jongno of the capital Seoul, the outlet number has increased with its 100th store at Mokdong of Seoul (1996), and its 200th store near Seoul University (2000). However, KFC's outlet closed due to failing sales, and dipped to around 120 stores by 2009. As of June 2014, KFC reopened some of its stores and operates 170 outlets in South Korea.
Sri Lanka	1995	Cargills	62 outlets. First outlet opened at Majestic City, Colombo, on 16 October 1995.
Taiwan	1985	Jardines	153 outlets. Taiwan's first KFC outlet was opened in the Ximending district of Taipei. It was initially a joint venture between KFC and Uni-President Enterprises Corporation, Taiwan's largest food company, until President sold its stake in 1997. Jardine's acquired full control of the poorly performing KFC Taiwan from Yum! in 2010.
Tajikistan	2021	?	9 outlets as of 2024. First outlet opened in Dushanbe on December 16, 2021.
Thailand	1984	Yum Restaurants International (Thailand) and Central Restaurants Group	717 outlets. Originally opened in 1970 but closed down after the end of the Vietnam War in 1975. KFC reopened in Thailand at Central Ladprao in Bangkok.
United Arab Emirates	1975	Americana Group	151 outlets.
Uzbekistan	2018	International Food Chain	27 outlets overall, including 22 outlets in Tashkent, 1 in Kokand, 2 in Andijan, 2 in Samarkand, and 1 in Fergana. First outlet opened in Tashkent.
Vietnam	1997	KFC Vietnam	136 outlets. First outlet opened in Ho Chi Minh City. Jardines acquired a 25% stake in the company in 2011. Euromonitor estimated that KFC has 15% of the fast food market by value in 2011, making it the leading company.
Yemen	?	Unknown	One outlet in Sanaa.

==== Gallery ====
The following is a gallery of KFC outlets in Asian countries.
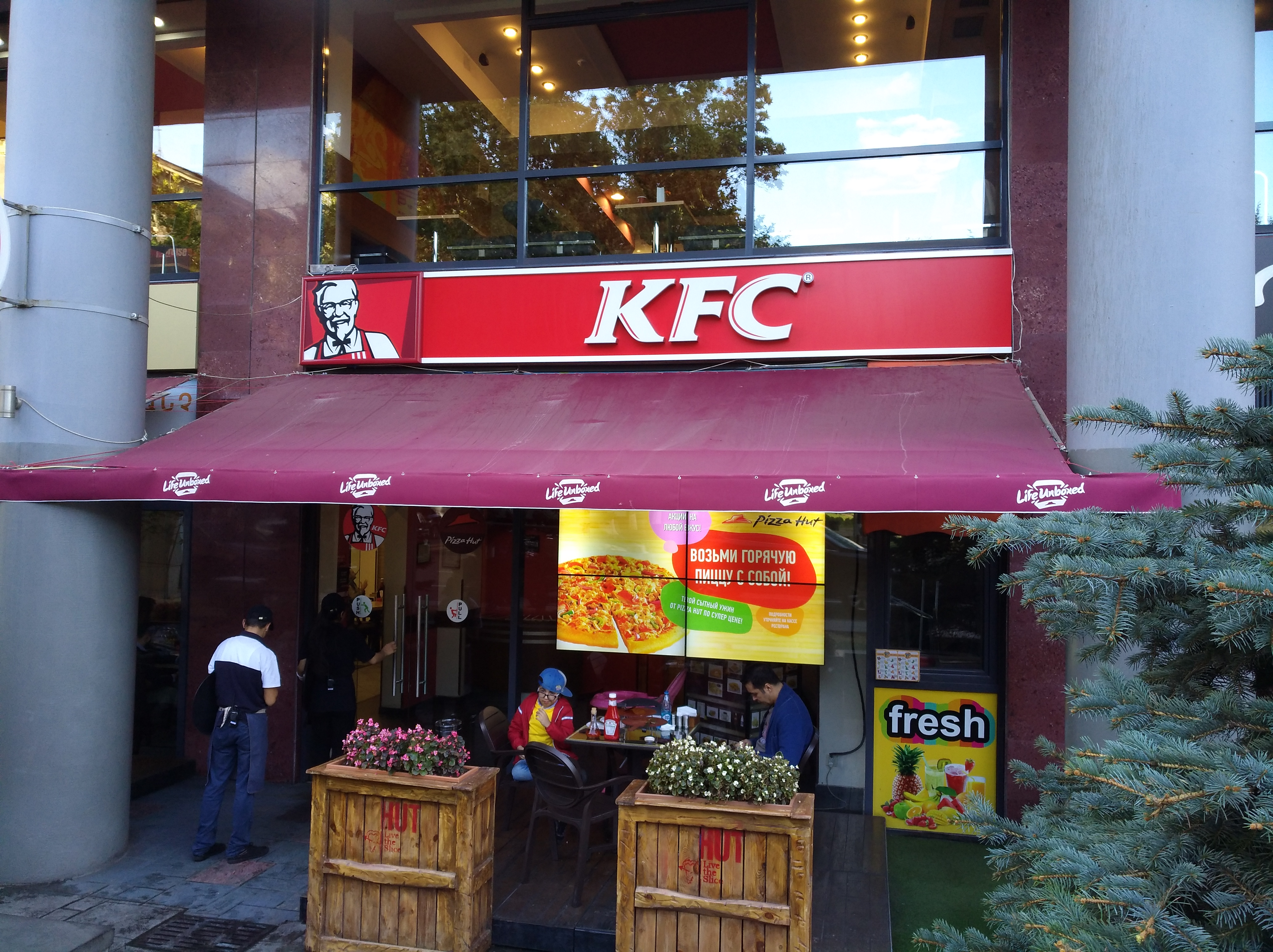
A KFC restaurant in Yerevan, Armenia

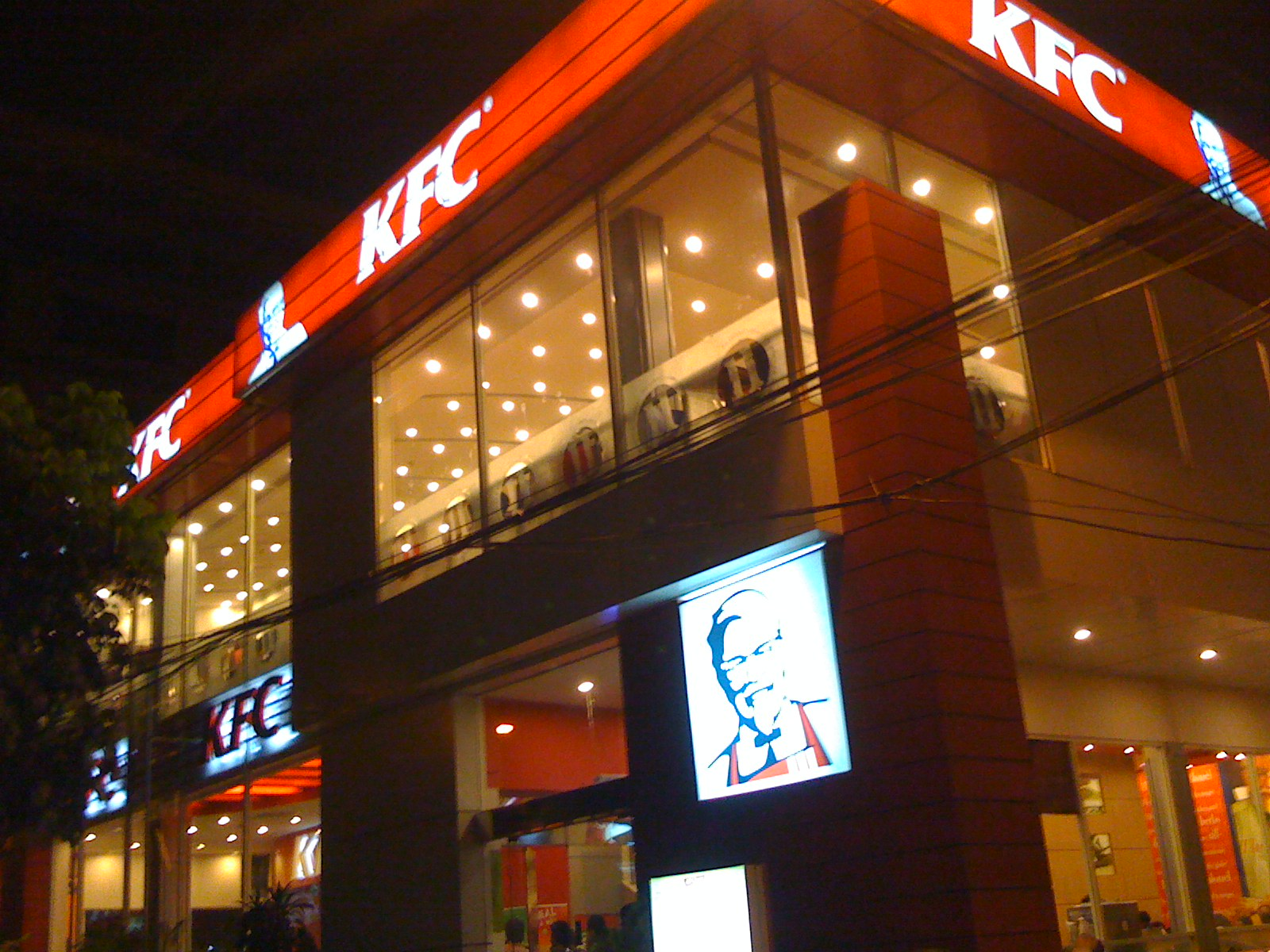
A KFC outlet in Dhaka, Bangladesh

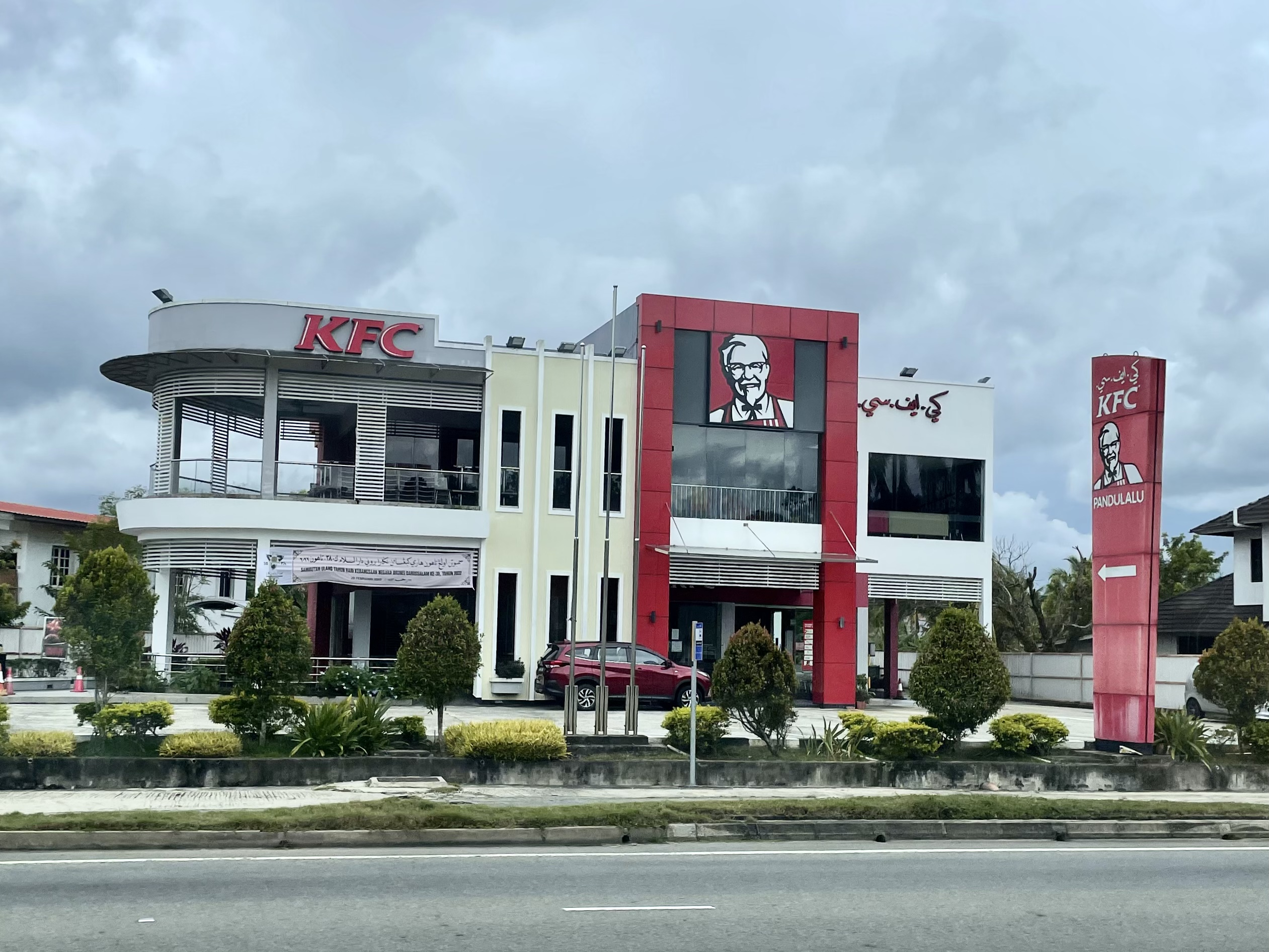
A KFC restaurant in Sengkurong, Brunei

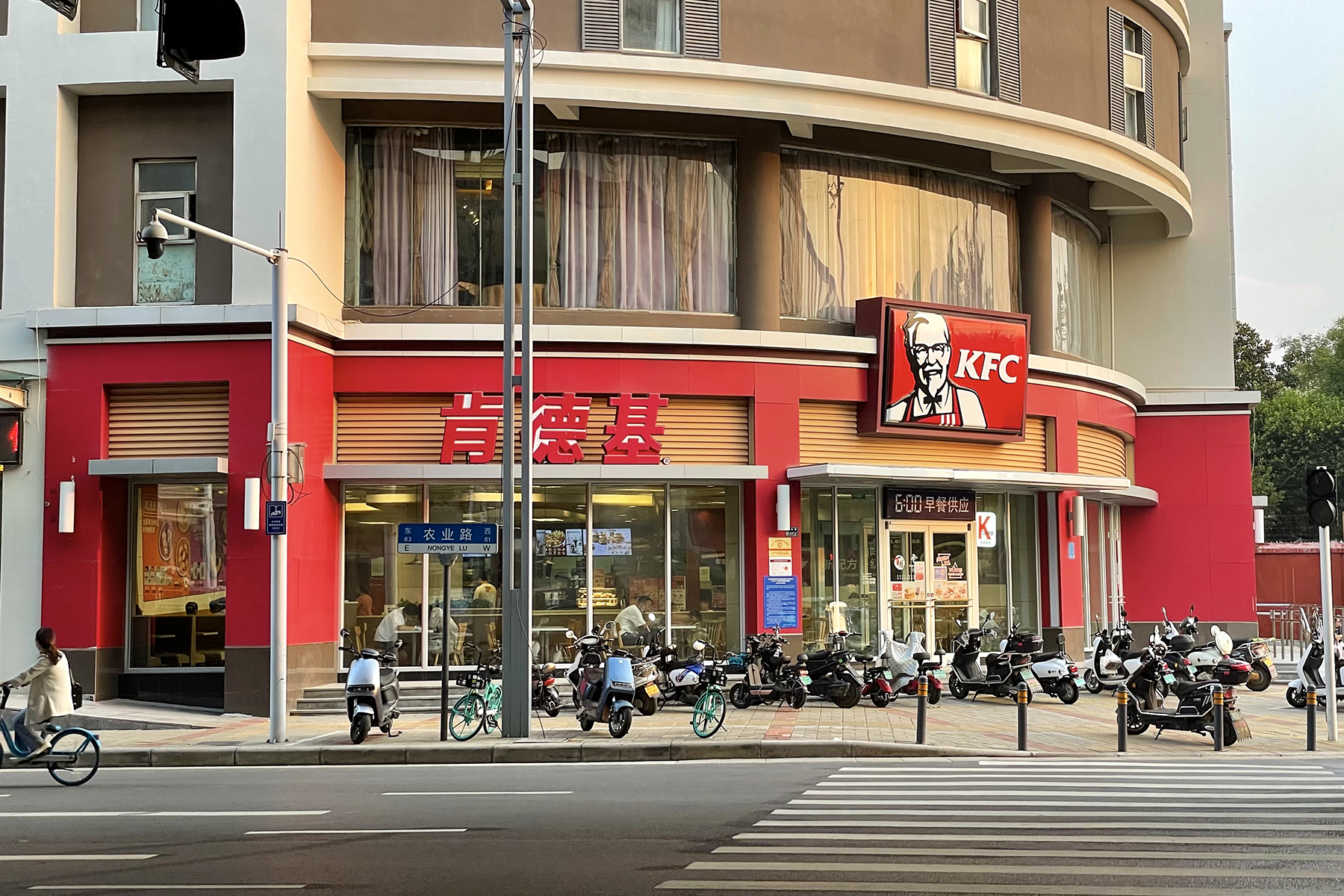
A KFC restaurant in Zhengzhou, China

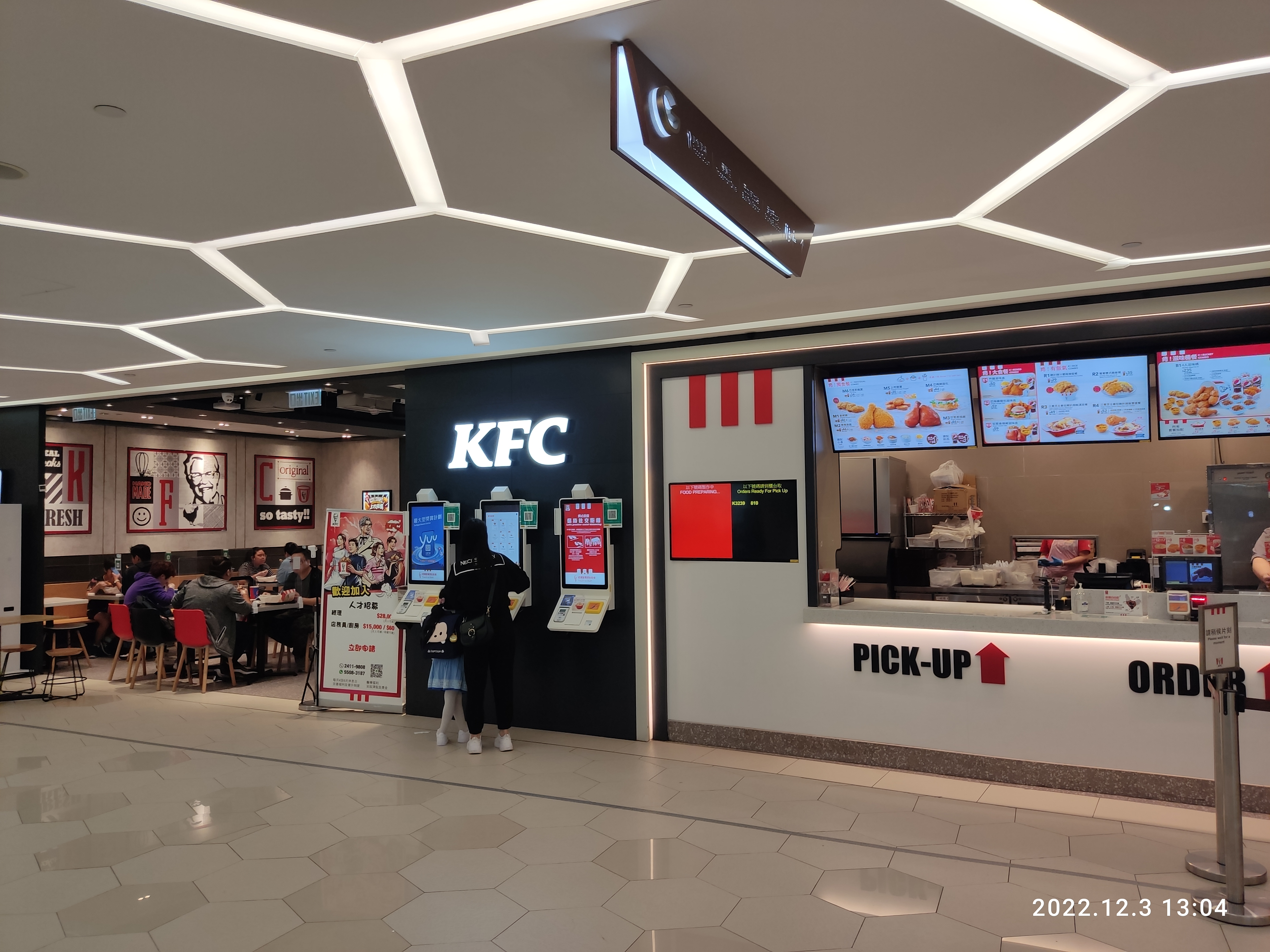
A KFC restaurant in Hong Kong

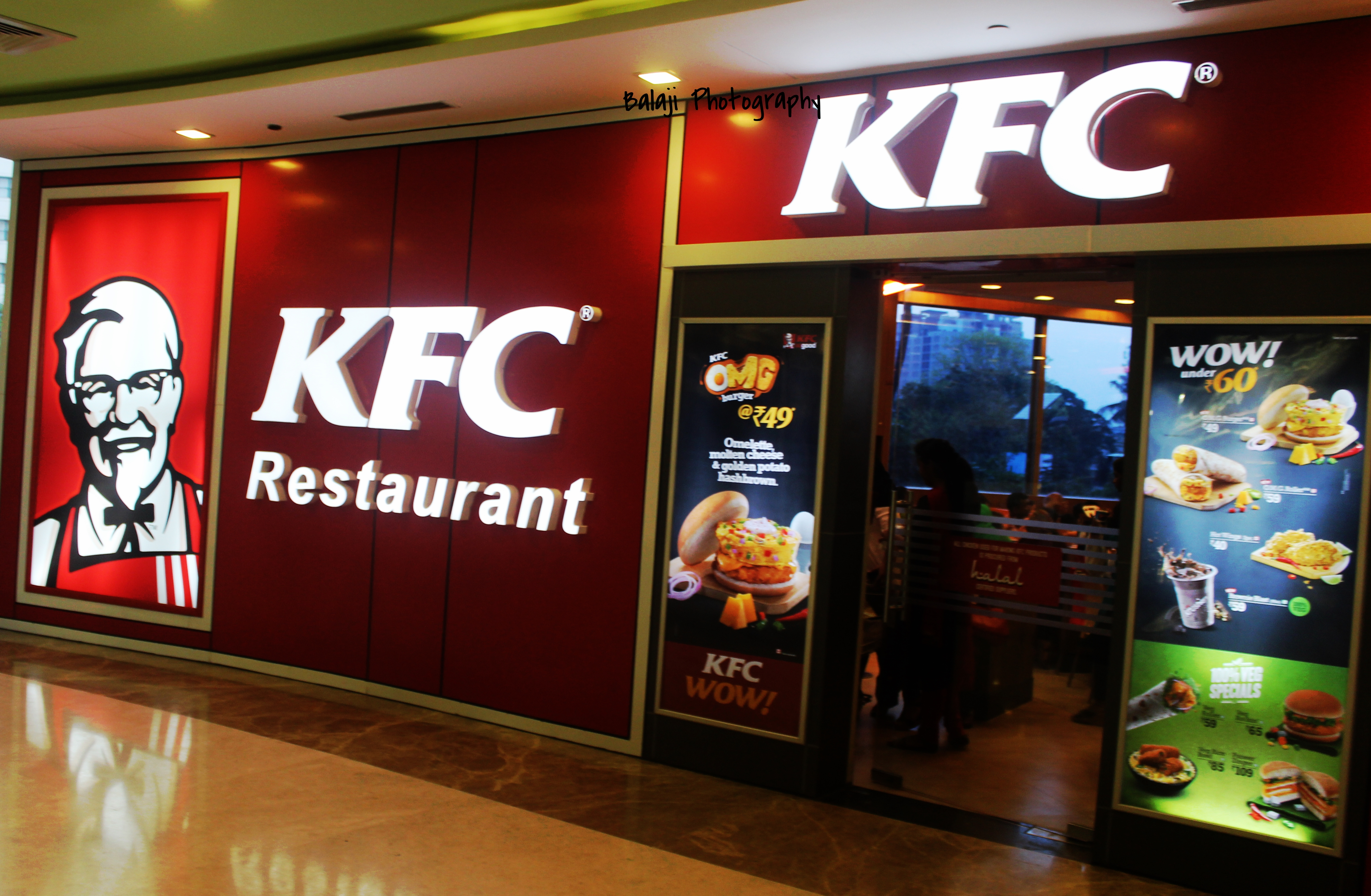
A KFC restaurant in Chennai, India

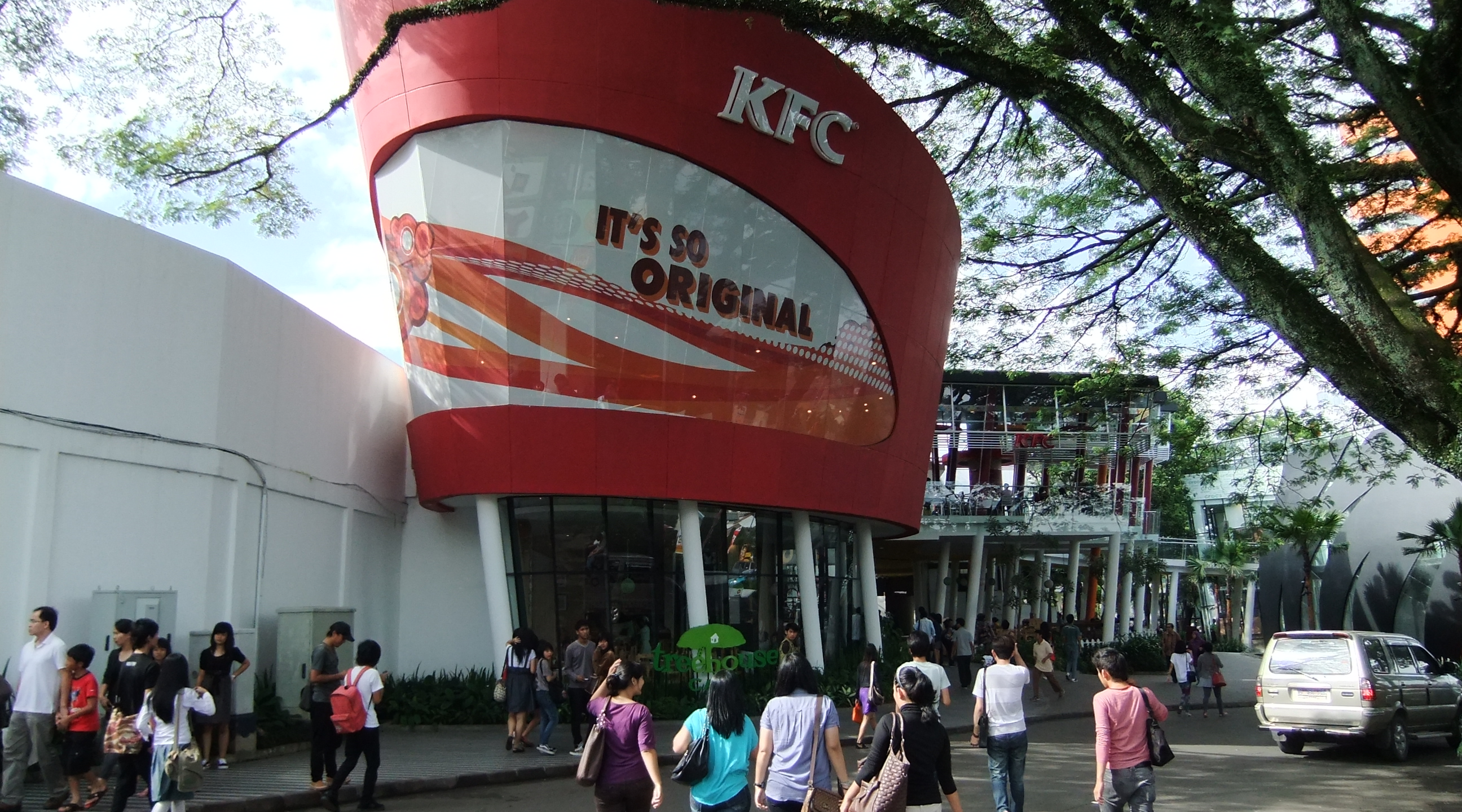
A KFC outlet in Bandung, Indonesia

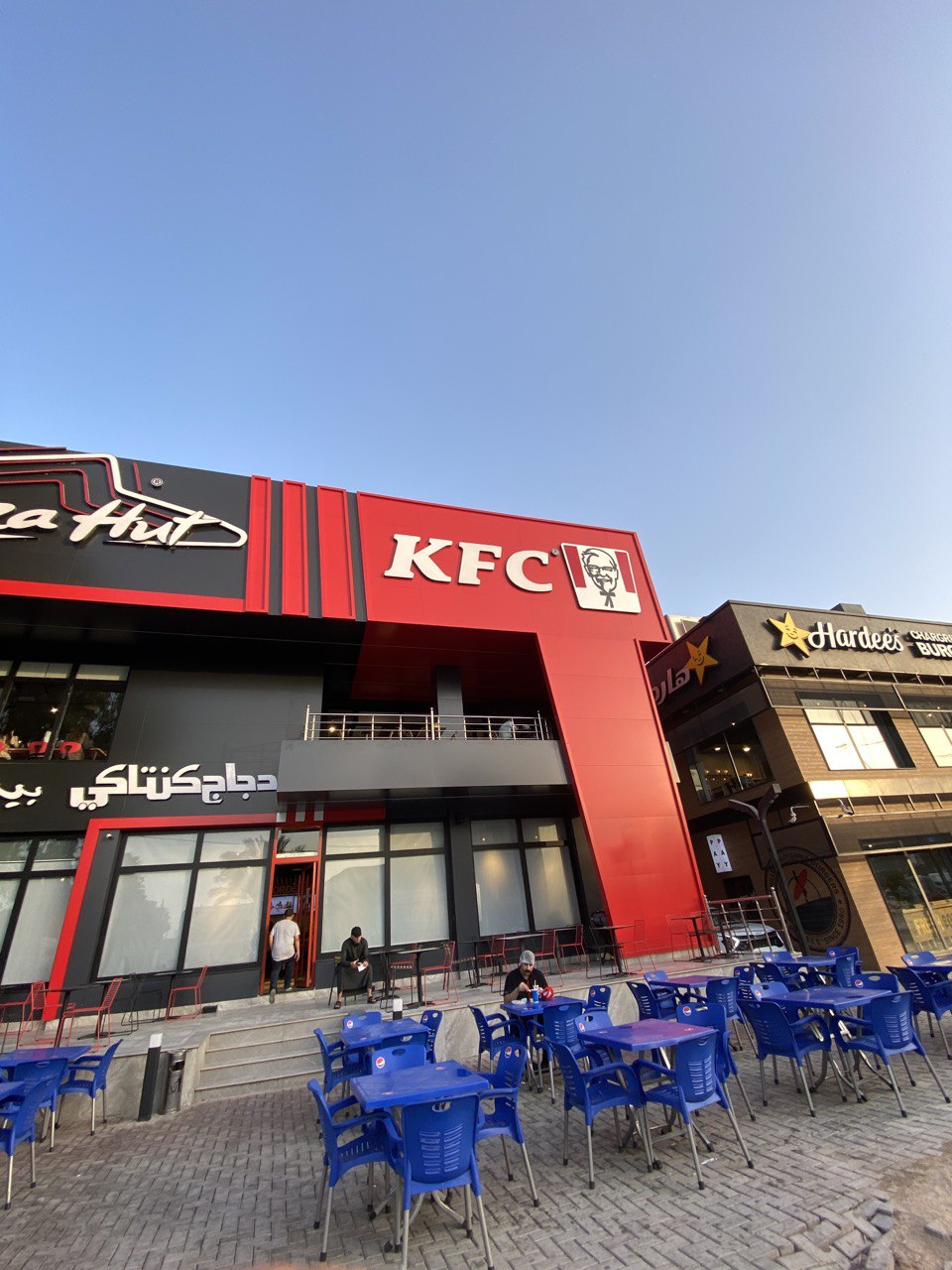
A KFC outlet in Baghdad, Iraq

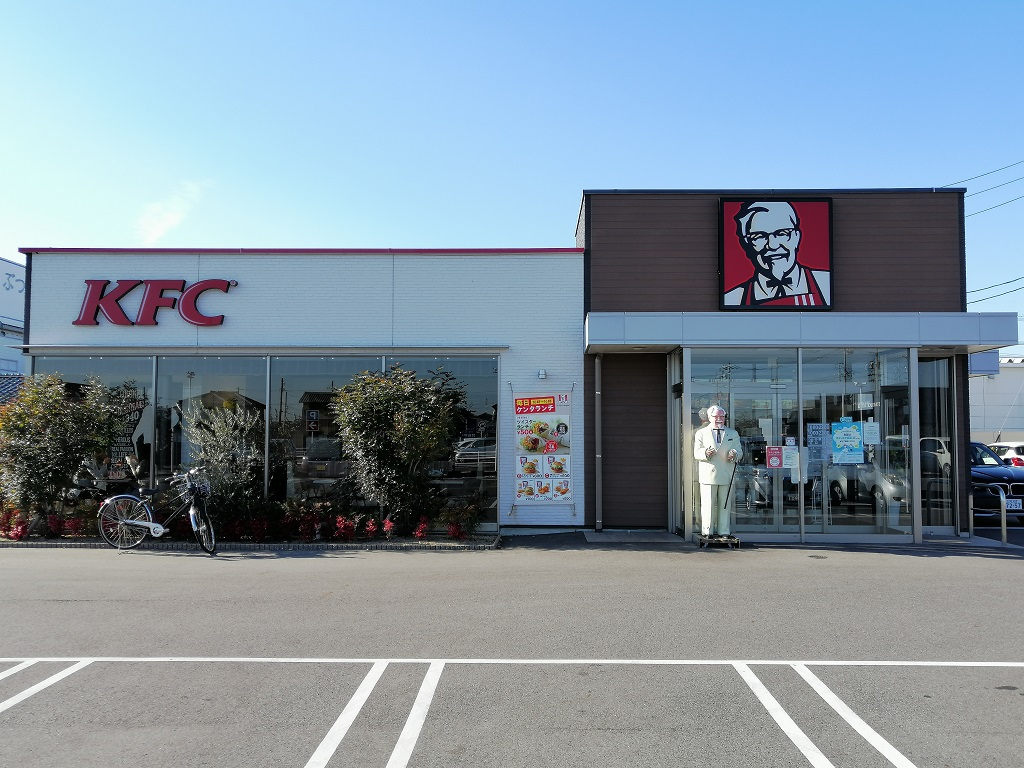
A KFC restaurant in Hekinan, Japan

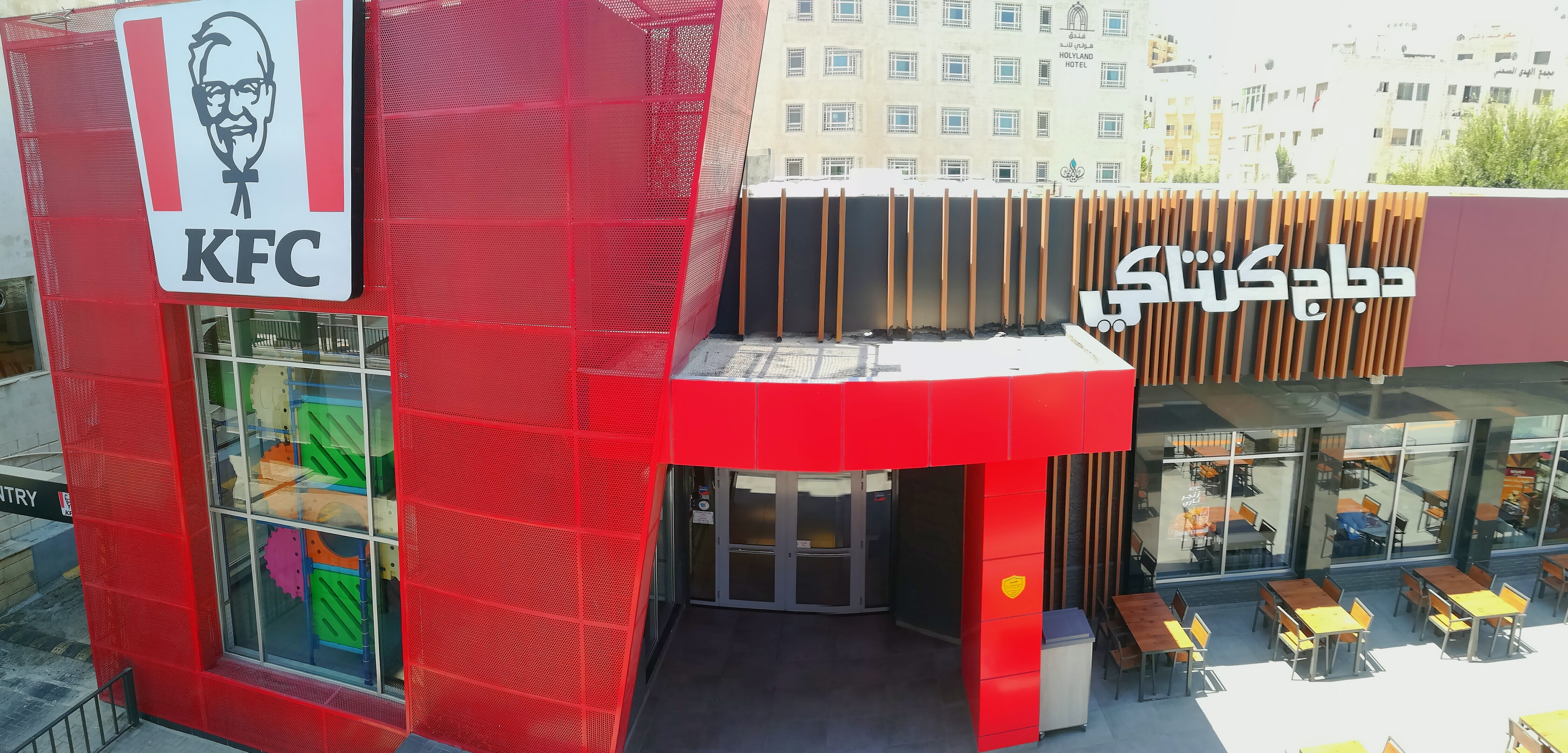
A KFC restaurant in Amman, Jordan

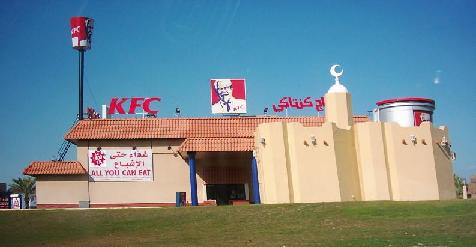
A former KFC restaurant in Kuwait City, Kuwait

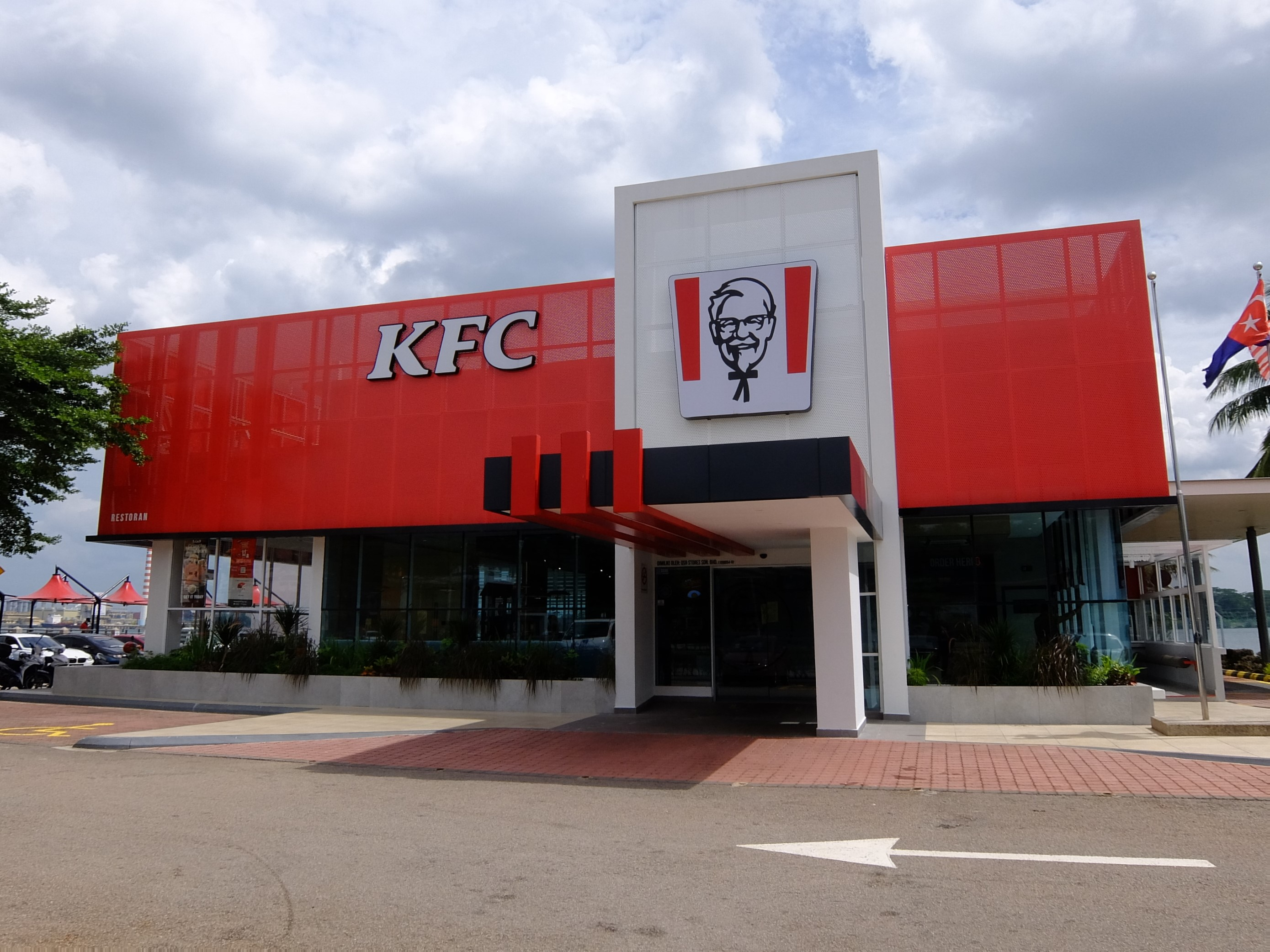
A KFC restaurant in Johor Bahru, Malaysia

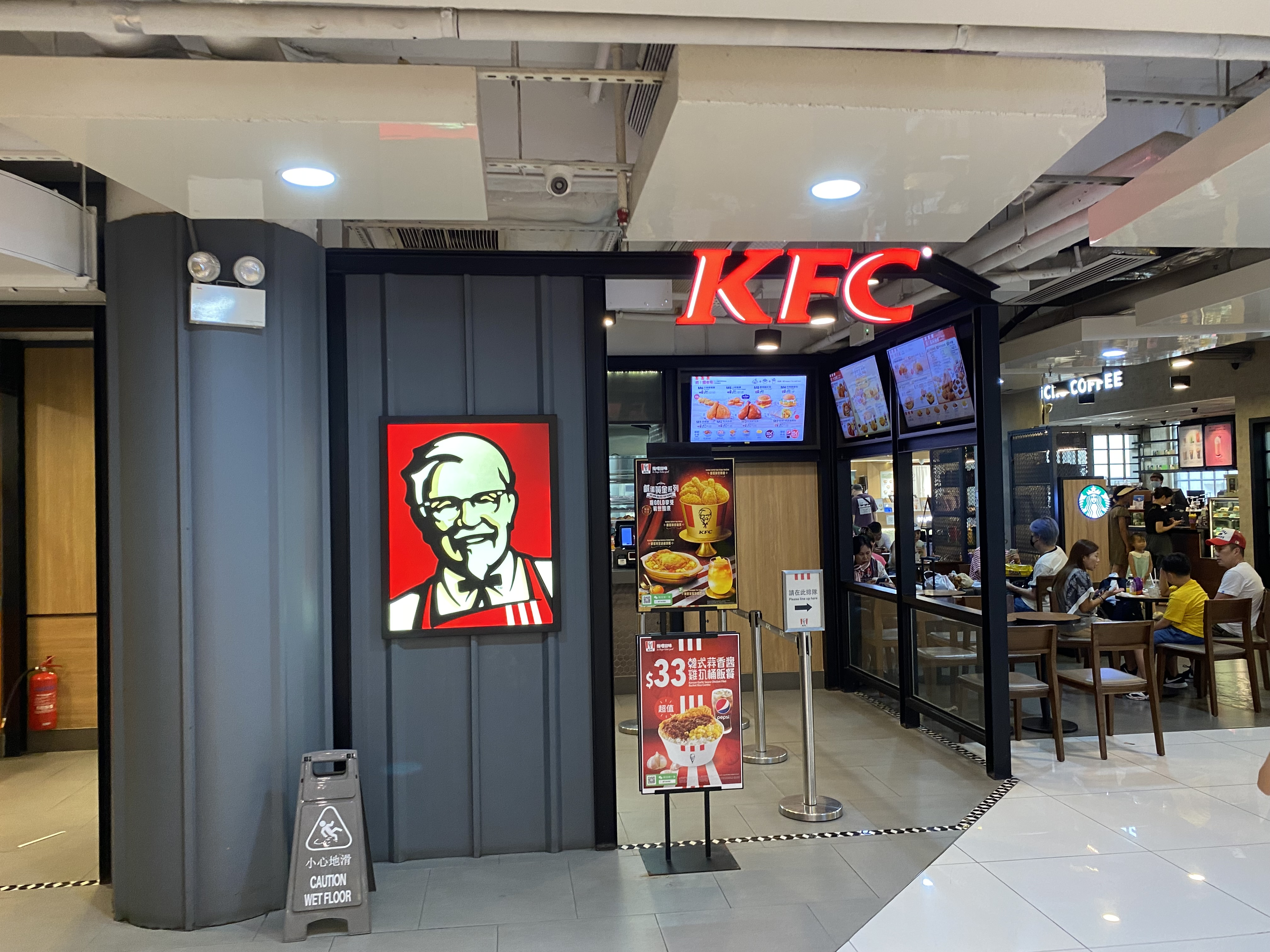
A KFC restaurant in Macau

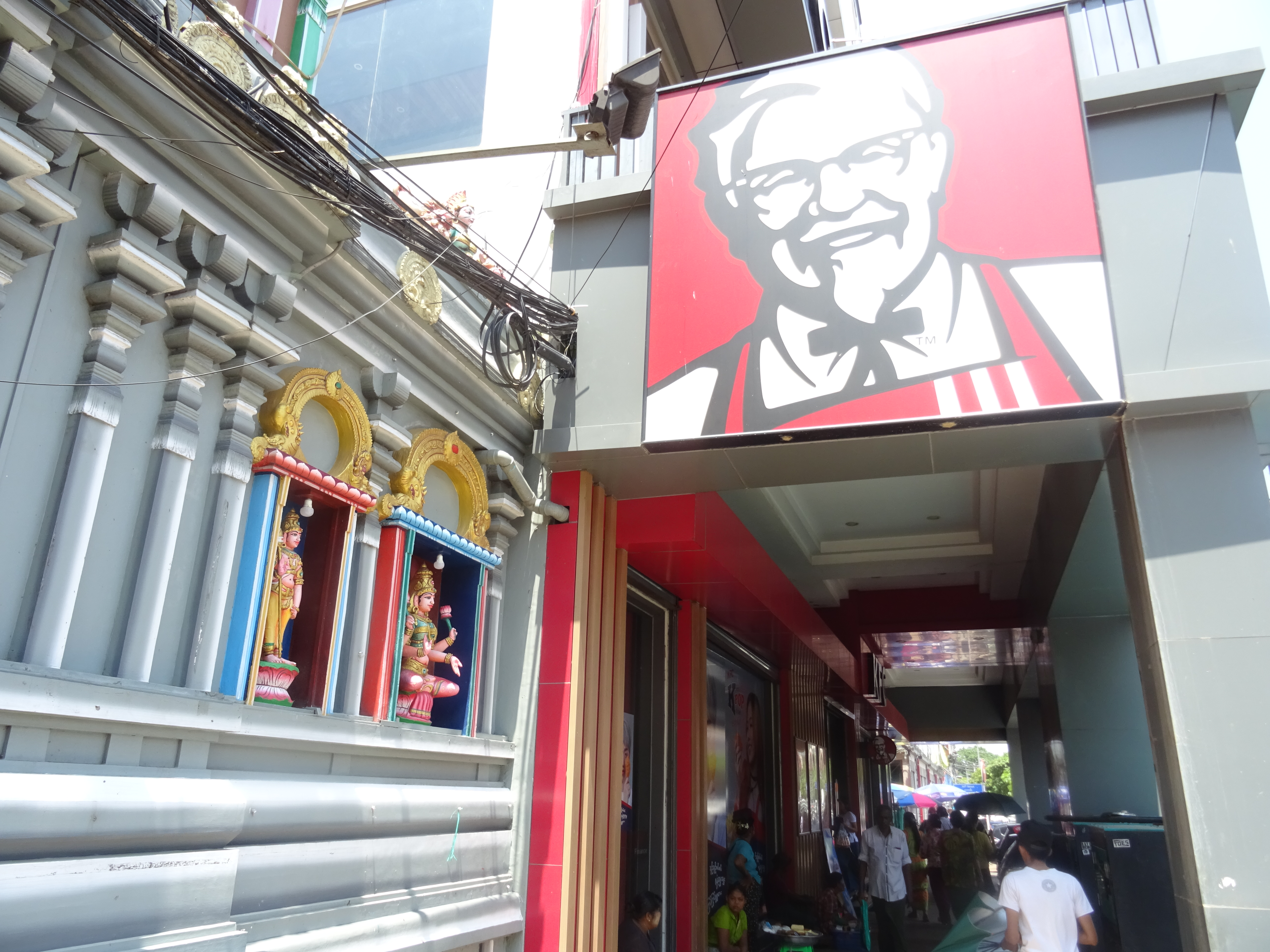
A KFC restaurant in Yangon, Myanmar

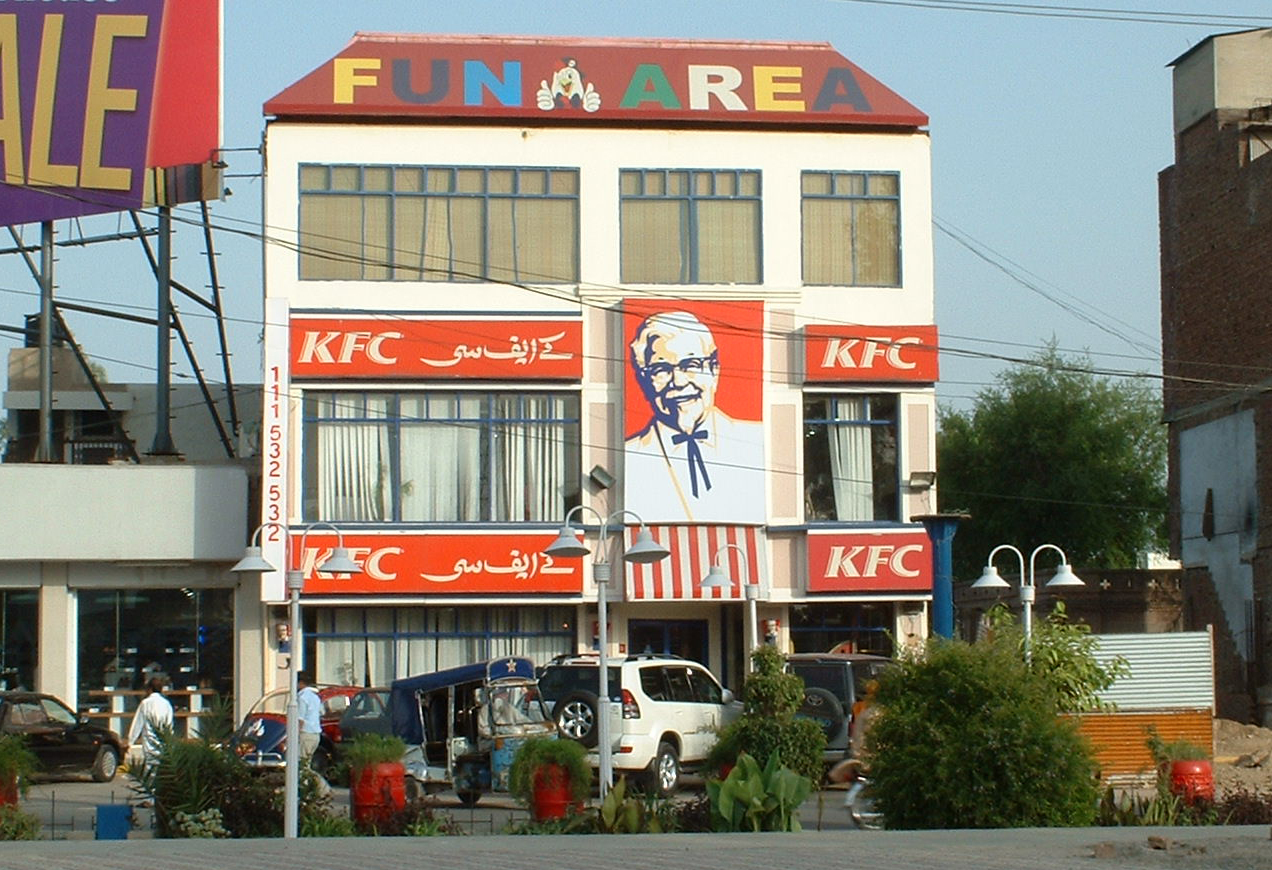
A KFC restaurant in Faisalabad, Pakistan

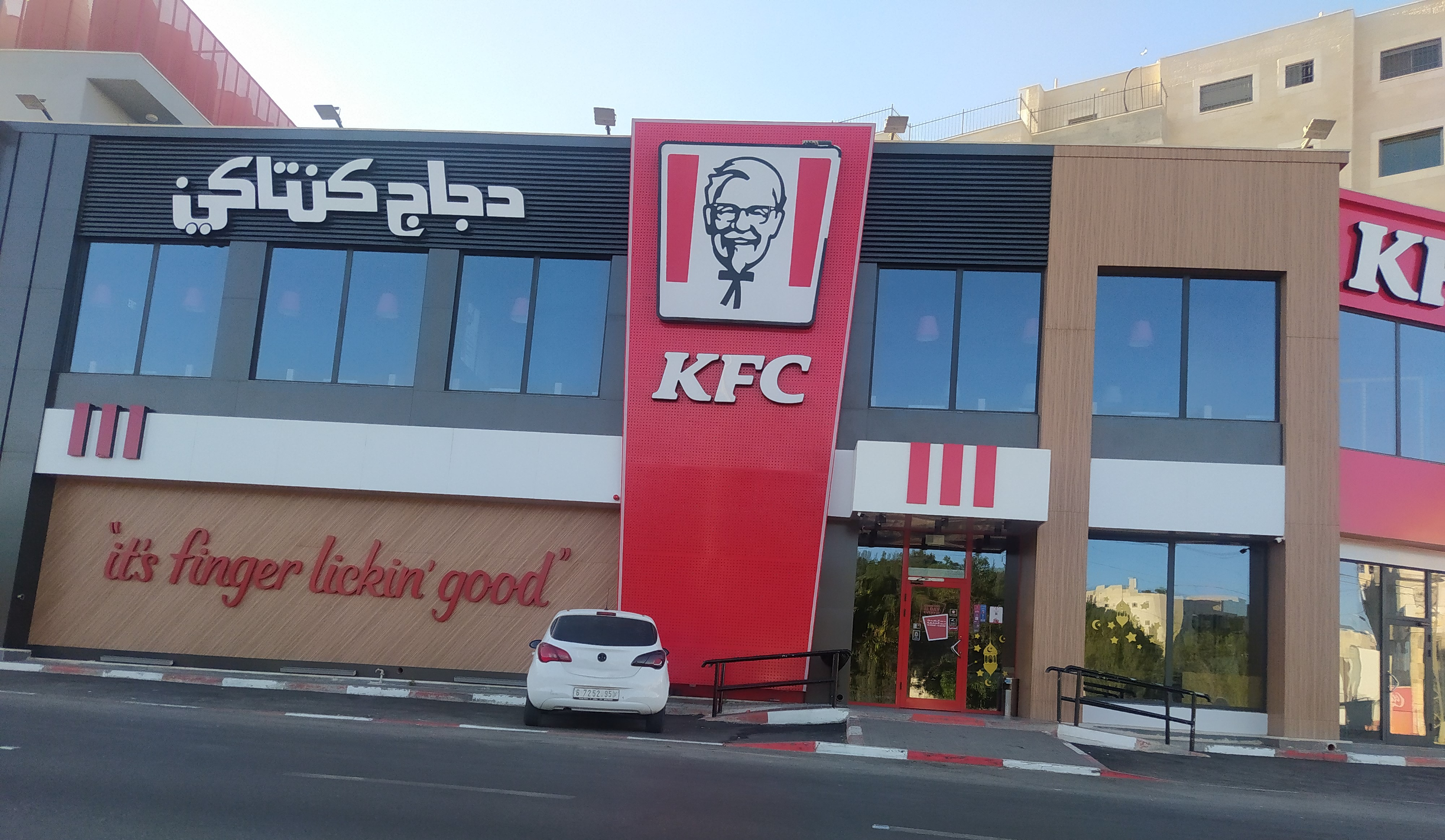
KFC in Birzeit, Palestine

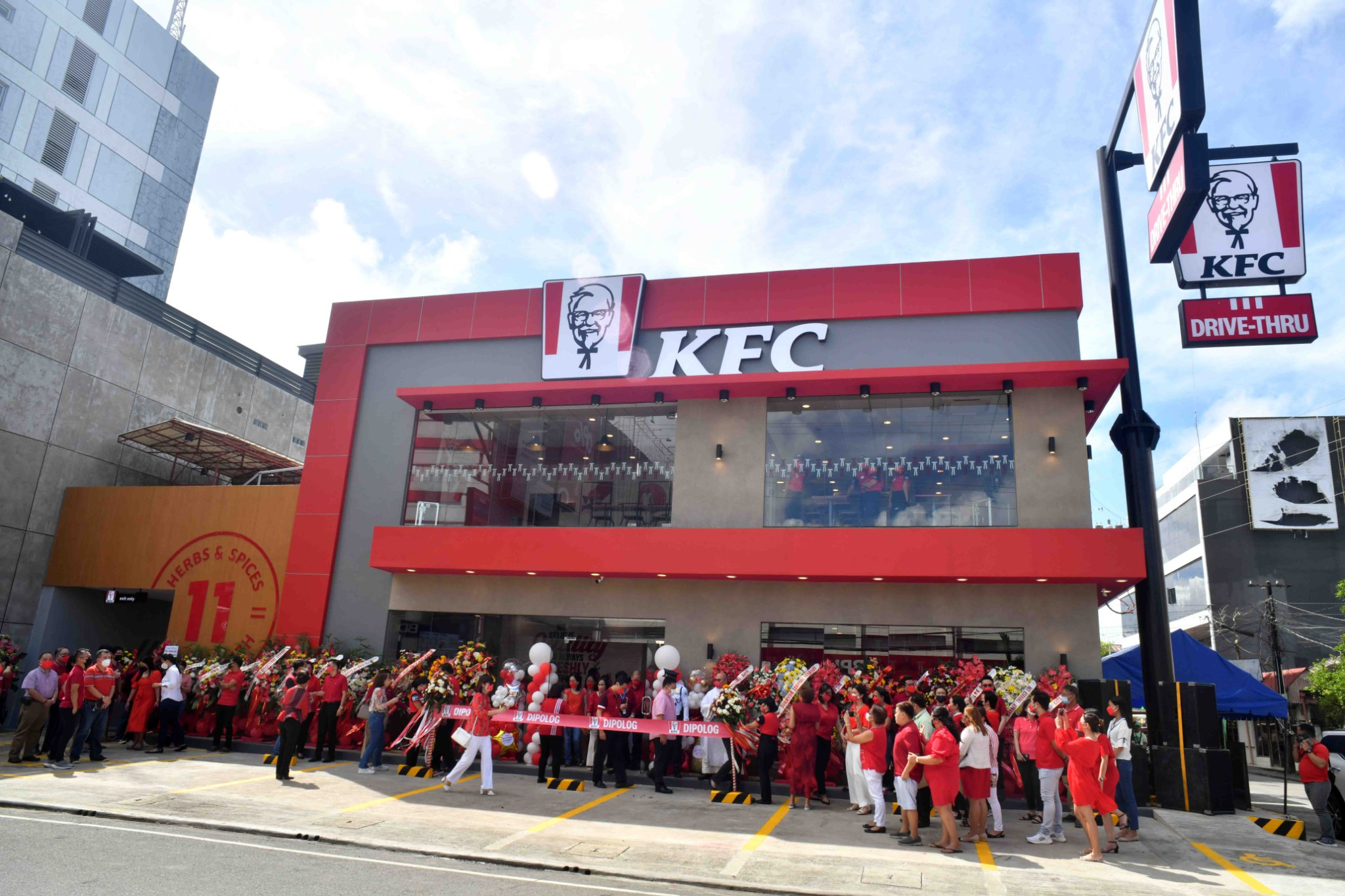
A KFC restaurant in Dipolog, Philippines

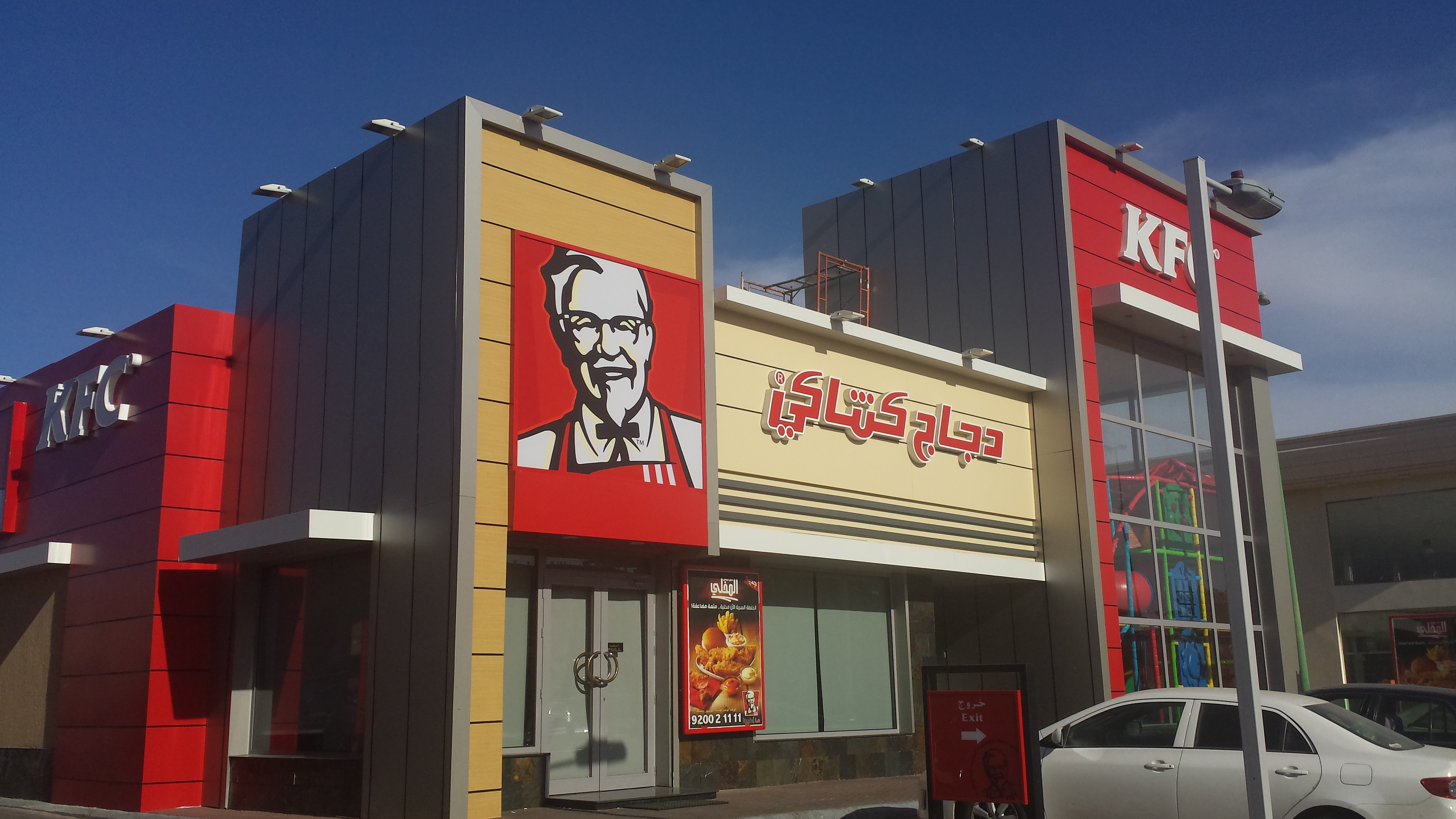
A KFC restaurant in Yanbu, Saudi Arabia

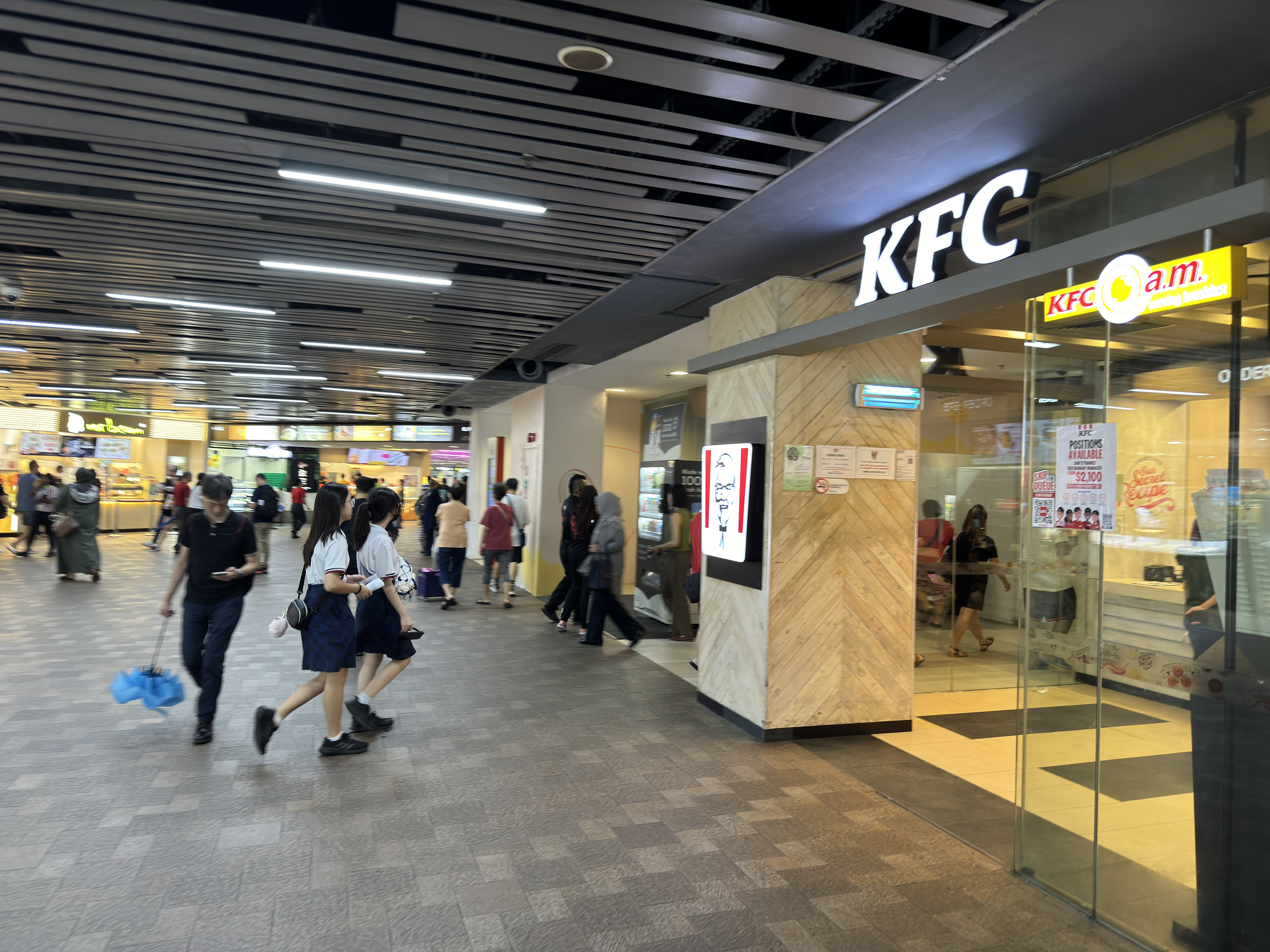
A KFC restaurant in the Woodlands MRT station in Singapore

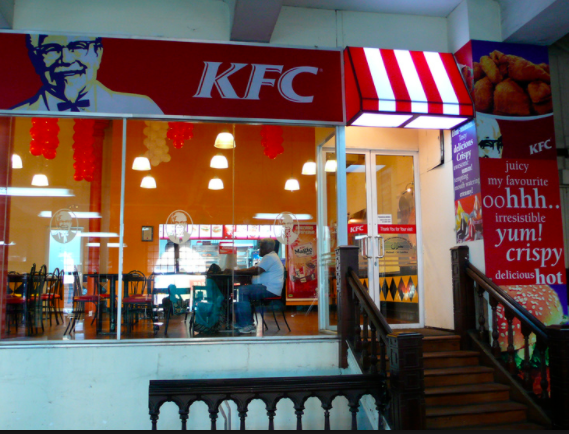
A KFC restaurant in Colombo, Sri Lanka

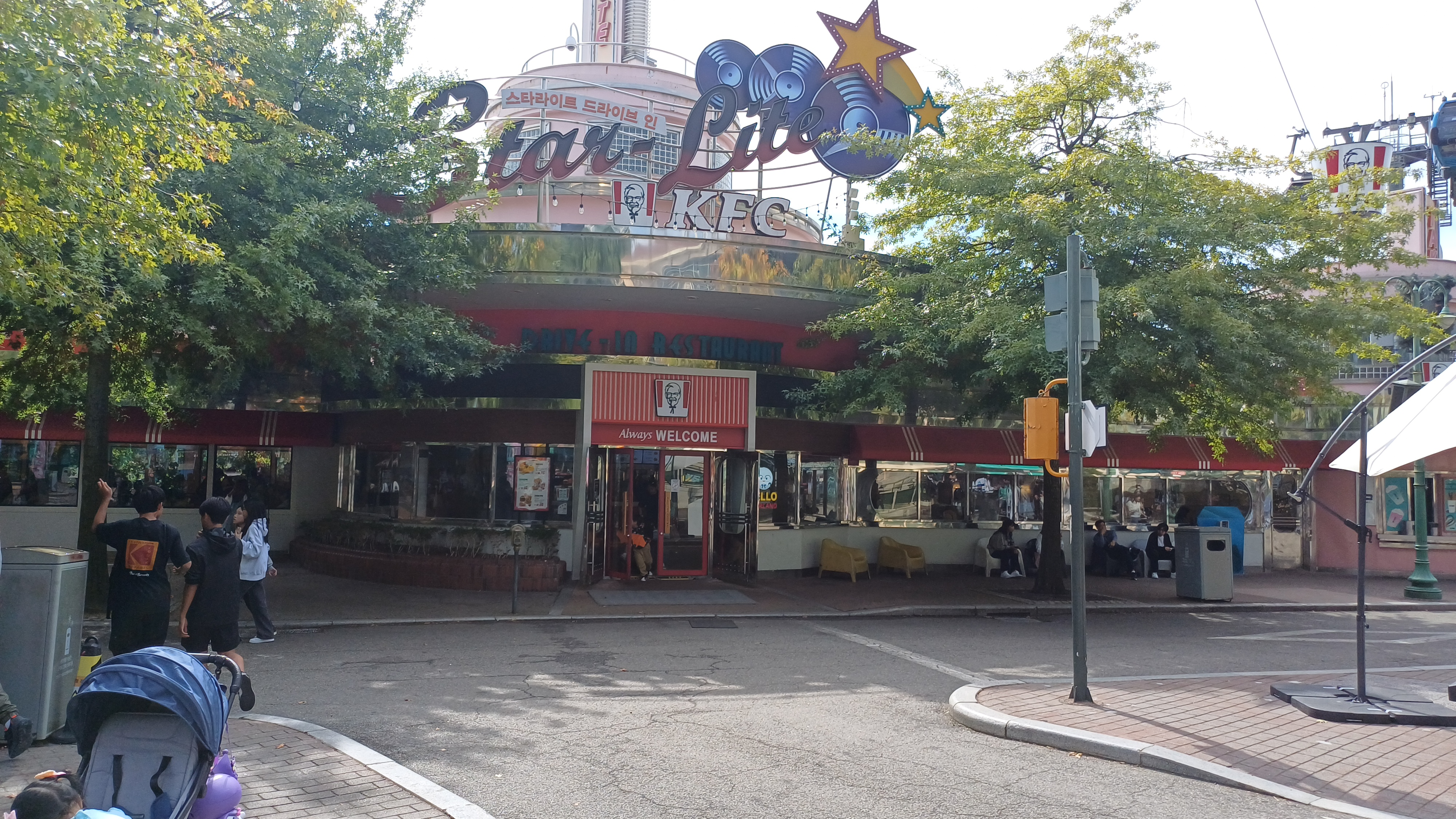
A KFC restaurant in Everland, South Korea

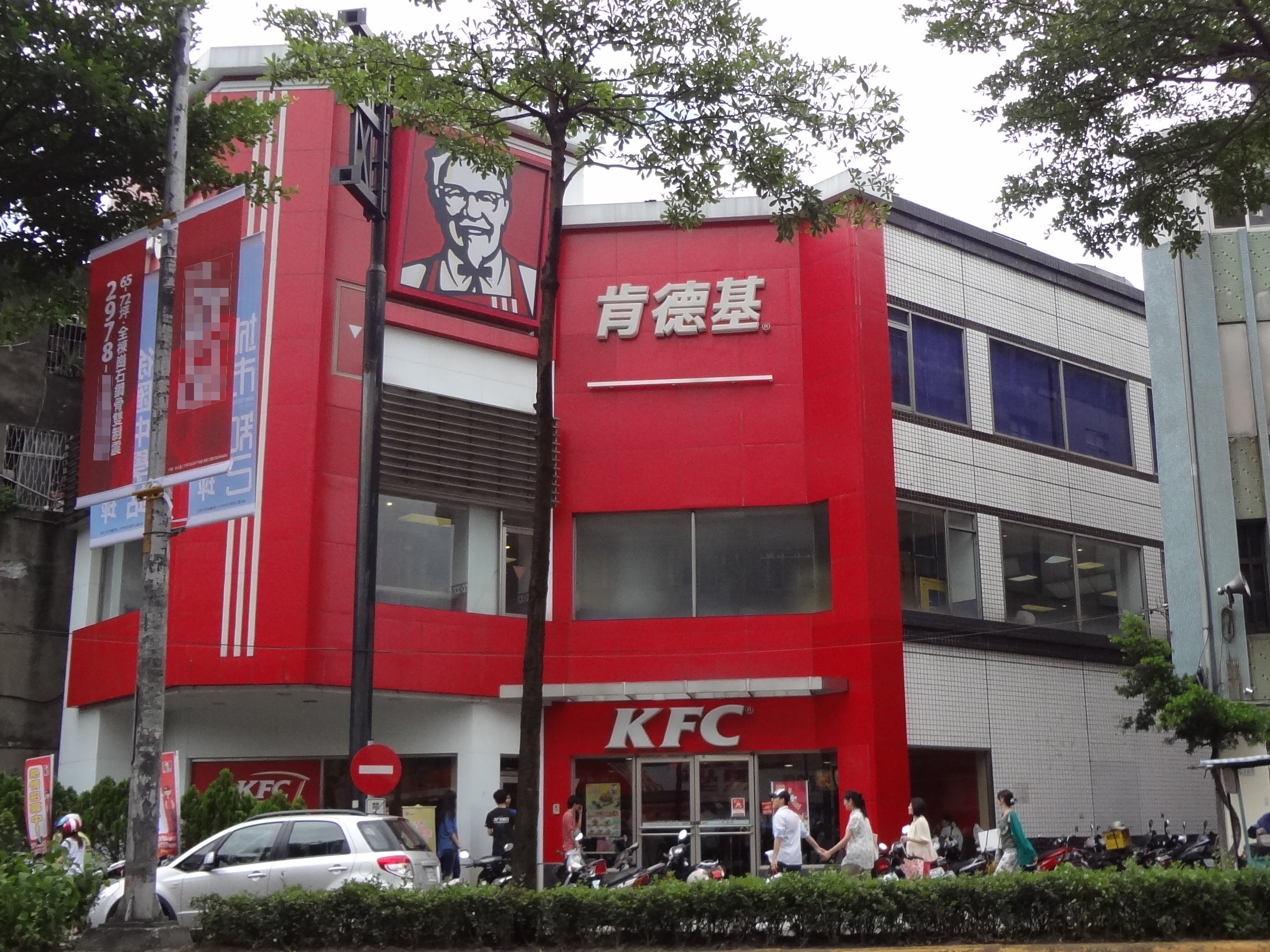
A KFC restaurant in New Taipei City, Taiwan

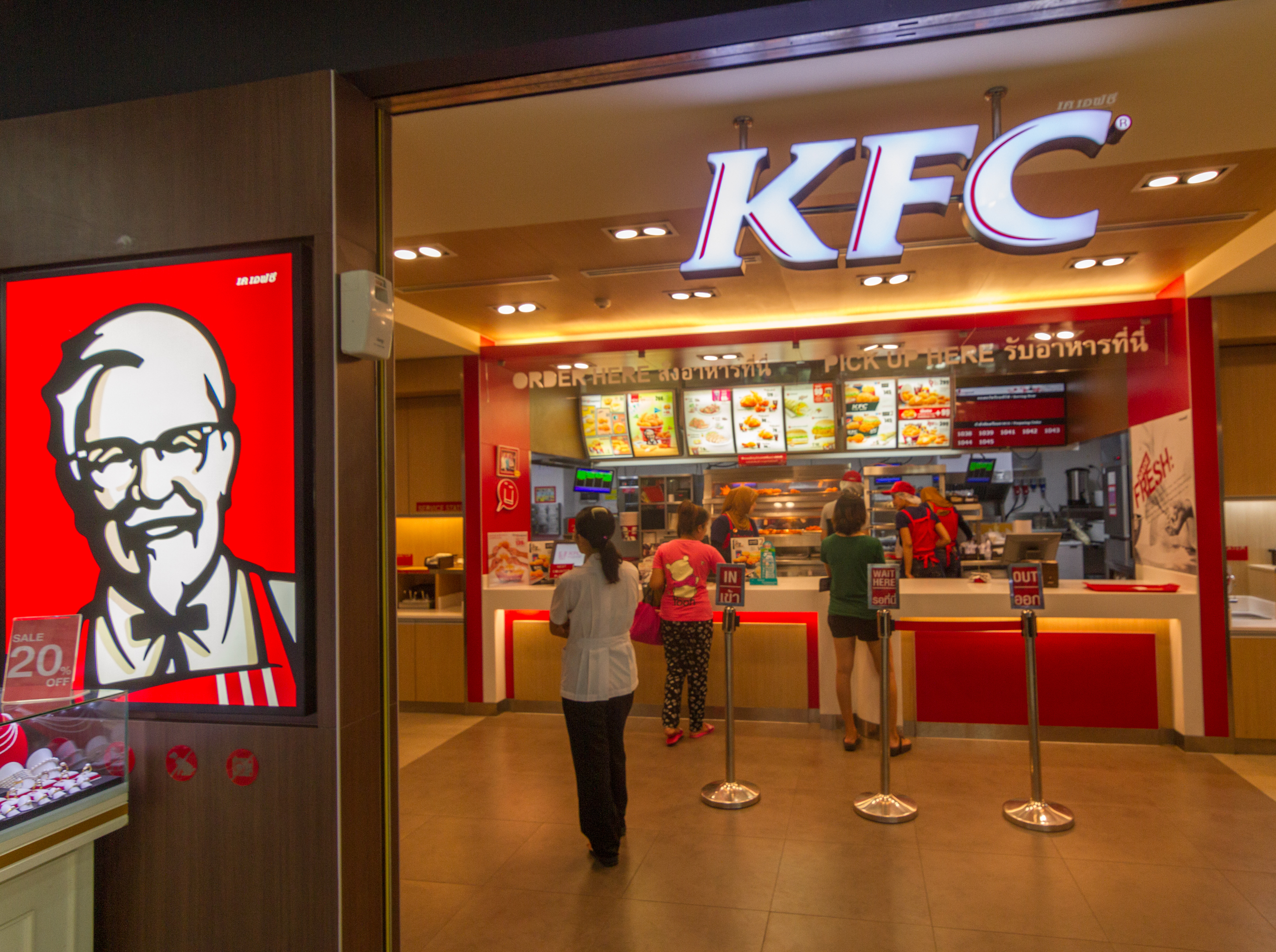
A KFC in Krabi, Thailand

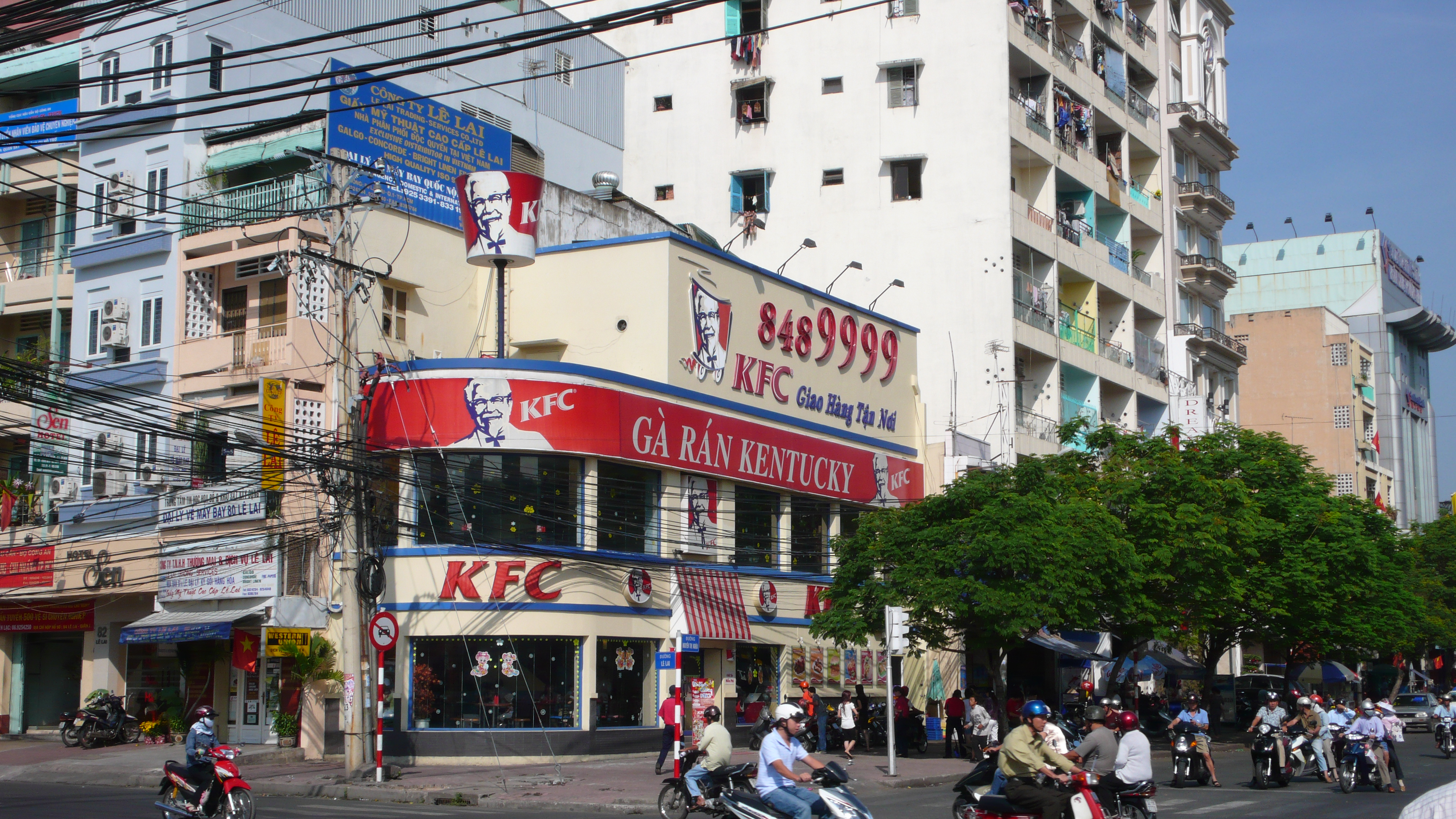
A KFC in Ho Chi Minh City, Vietnam

=== Caribbean, Central and South America ===
Country/region	Year entered	Outlets	First outlet	Owner/major operator	Notes
Antigua and Barbuda	1993	3	?	KFC Antigua	
Argentina	1980–1990, 2013	45	Buenos Aires	Desarrollos Gastronómicos S.A.	
Aruba	1972	4	?	Hucor Holding	
(The Bahamas) Bahamas	1967	13	?	Myers Group	
Barbados	1971	12	?	?	
Bolivia	2014	3	Santa Cruz de la Sierra	Delosur S.A.	
Bonaire	1992	1	?	Harborside Foodcourt, NV, Ruth van Tilburg-Obre	
Brazil	1973–1982, 1992–2000, 2008	60	?	Brazil Fast Food Corporation	The company entered a change in strategy in 1997, when it announced plans to close its 7 urban locations and relocate to 8 shopping centre locations. 44 outlets on States of Bahia, Rio de Janeiro, Ceará, São Paulo, Paraná and Distrito Federal.
Cayman Islands	1976	3	?	KFC Cayman	KFC was the first food franchise in the Cayman Islands.
Chile	1992	97	Santiago	Desarrollos Gastronomicos S.A. (Degasa)	
Colombia	1993	79	?	INT	
Costa Rica	1970	43	Paseo Colon	QSR International	
Curaçao	1970	7	?	Hucor Holding	
Dominica	2006	1	?	Fine Foods Inc	
Dominican Republic	1997	27	?	Kentucky Foods Group Ltd	
Ecuador	1975	180	Quito	INT Food Services Corp.	KFC is the largest fast food chain in Ecuador, and it is KFC's largest market in the region.
El Salvador	2002	7	?	Corporacion de Franquicias Americanas (CFA)	
French Guiana	2019	4	?	?	
Grenada	1988	4	?	?	
Guadeloupe	?	5	?	?	
Guatemala	2009	7	?	?	
Guyana	1994–2014, 2016	5	Georgetown	Didco	Reached four outlets, but the market was abandoned in 2014. Reopened in 2016.
Honduras	2004	15	San Pedro Sula	Grupo Comidas	
Jamaica	1975	42	Kingston	Restaurants of Jamaica	
Martinique	?	1	?	?	
Nicaragua	2026	3	Managua	Yum! Brands International	4 outlets. First outlet opened July 24, 2026.
Panama	1969	44	?	Franquicias Panamenas	
Paraguay	2014	3	?	Southfood S.A.	
Peru	1981	140	Lima	Delosi	KFC is the oldest and the largest US fast food chain in Peru.
Saint Kitts and Nevis	2019	1	?	?	
Saint Lucia	2011	4	?	?	
Sint Maarten	?	4	?	?	
Saint Vincent and the Grenadines	1986	2	Kingstown	Ken Boyea	
Suriname	1996	6	?	Cirkel Group	
Trinidad and Tobago	1973	60	Saint James, Port of Spain	Prestige Holdings Limited	
United States Virgin Islands	?	5	?	?	
Uruguay	2025	4	Punta Carretas Shopping, Montevideo	Desarrollos Gastronomicos S.A. (Degasa)	The last South American country to open in the country. Opened its first outlet on July 15, 2025. KFC is available in every country in South America except Falkland Islands.
Venezuela	1973	25	?	?	

==== Gallery ====
The following is a gallery of KFC outlets in Caribbean, Central, and South American countries.
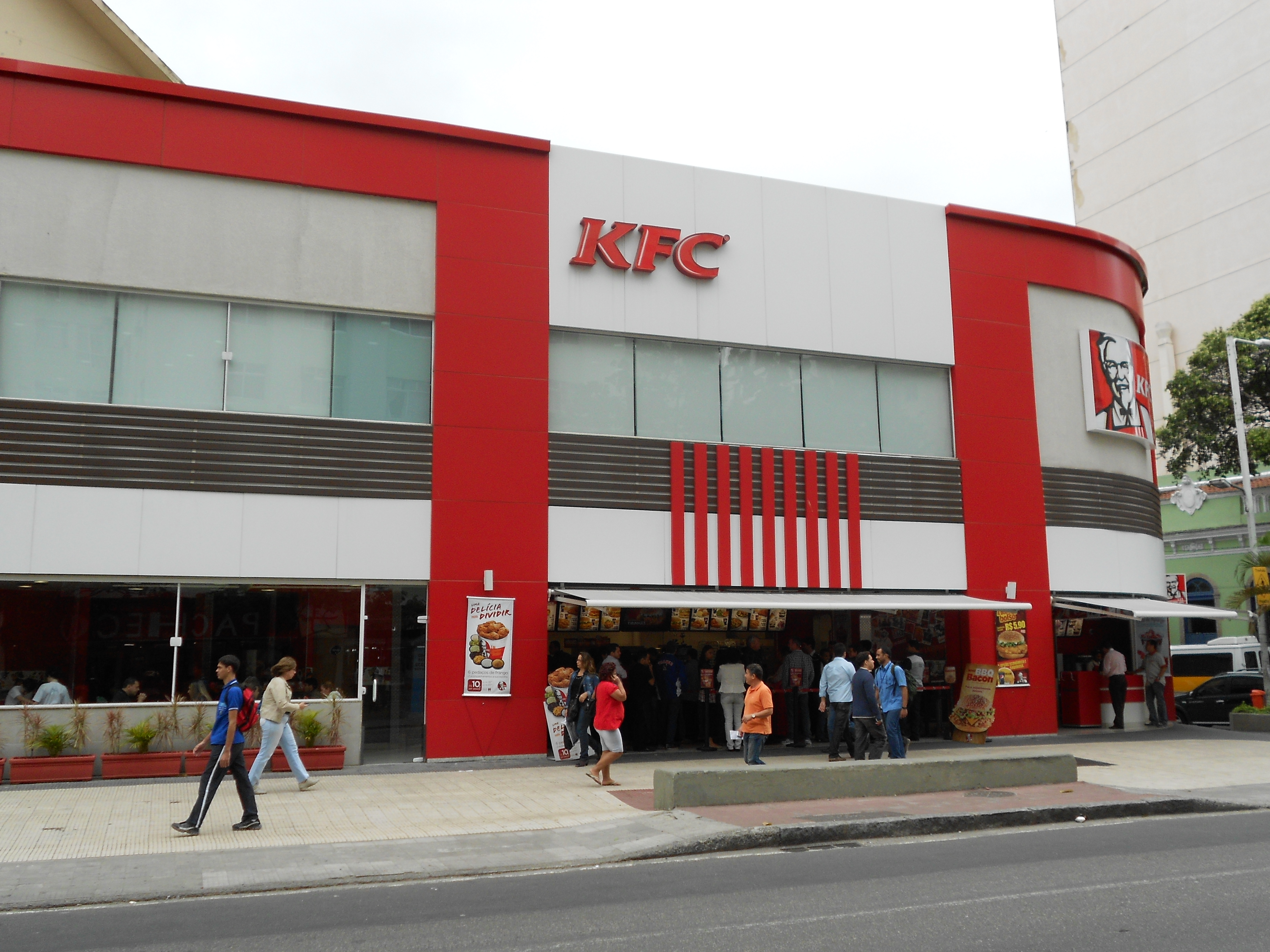
A KFC restaurant in Rio de Janeiro, Brazil

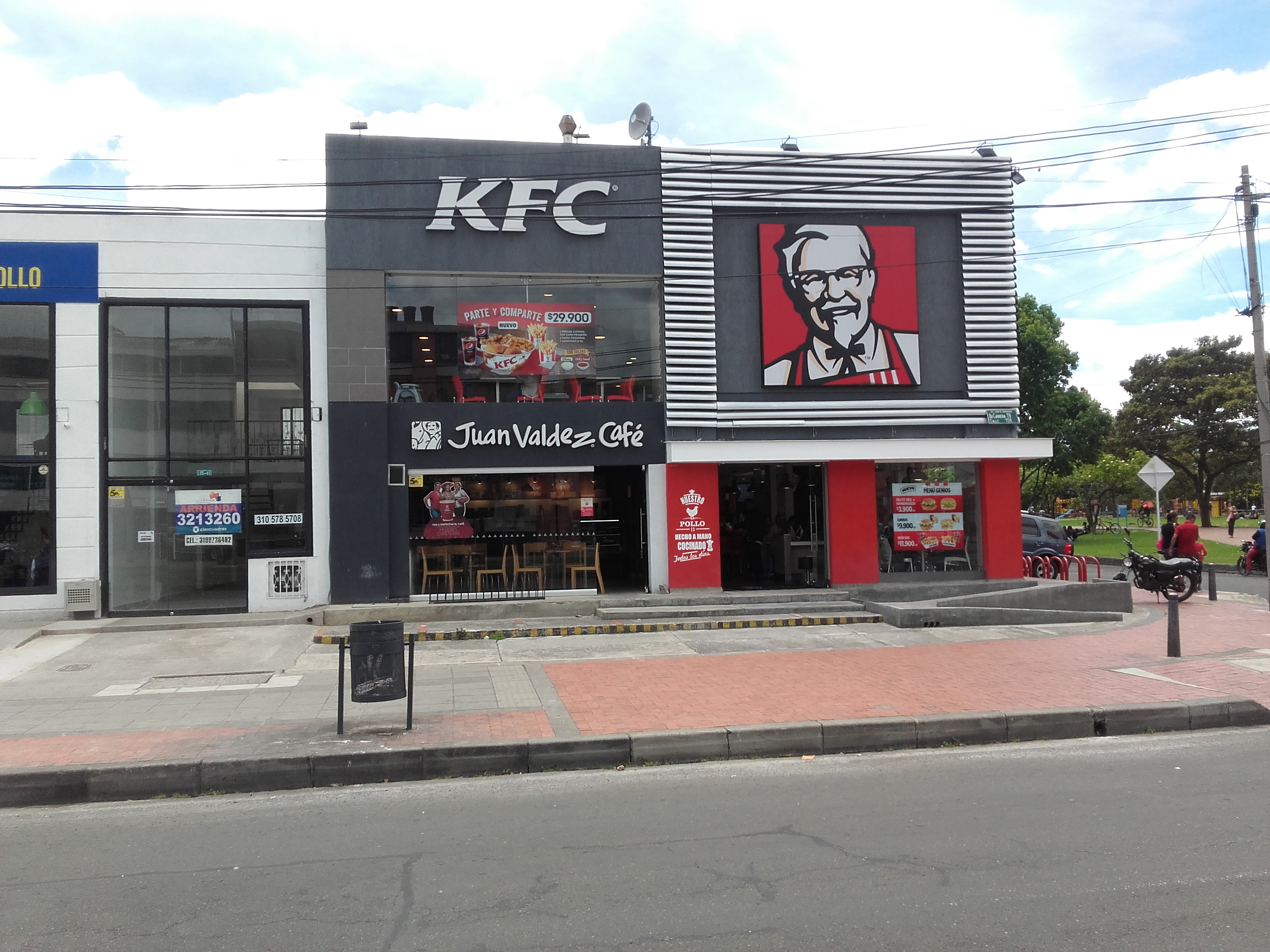
A KFC restaurant in Bogotá, Colombia

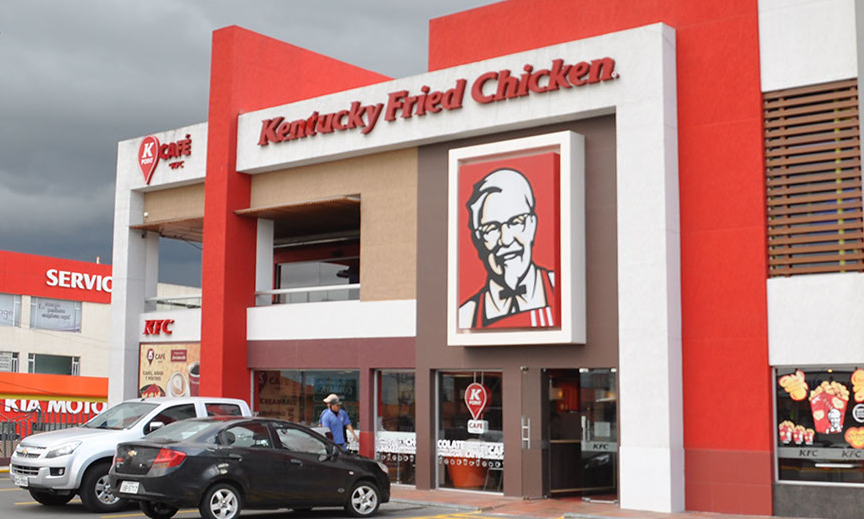
A KFC restaurant in Quito, Ecuador. The country is the largest market for the chain in the Caribbean and South America, with more than 150 locations.

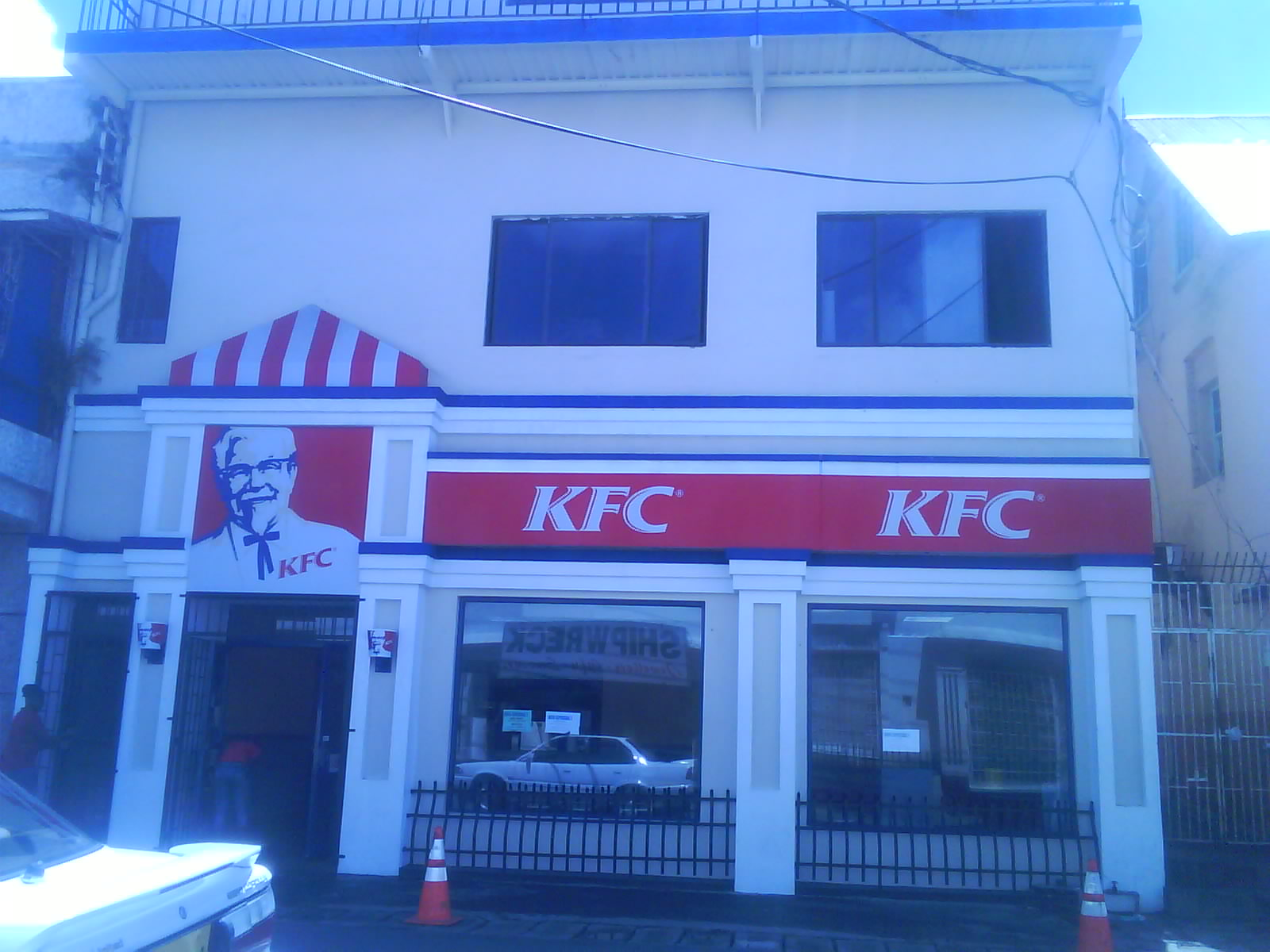
A KFC restaurant in St. George's, Grenada

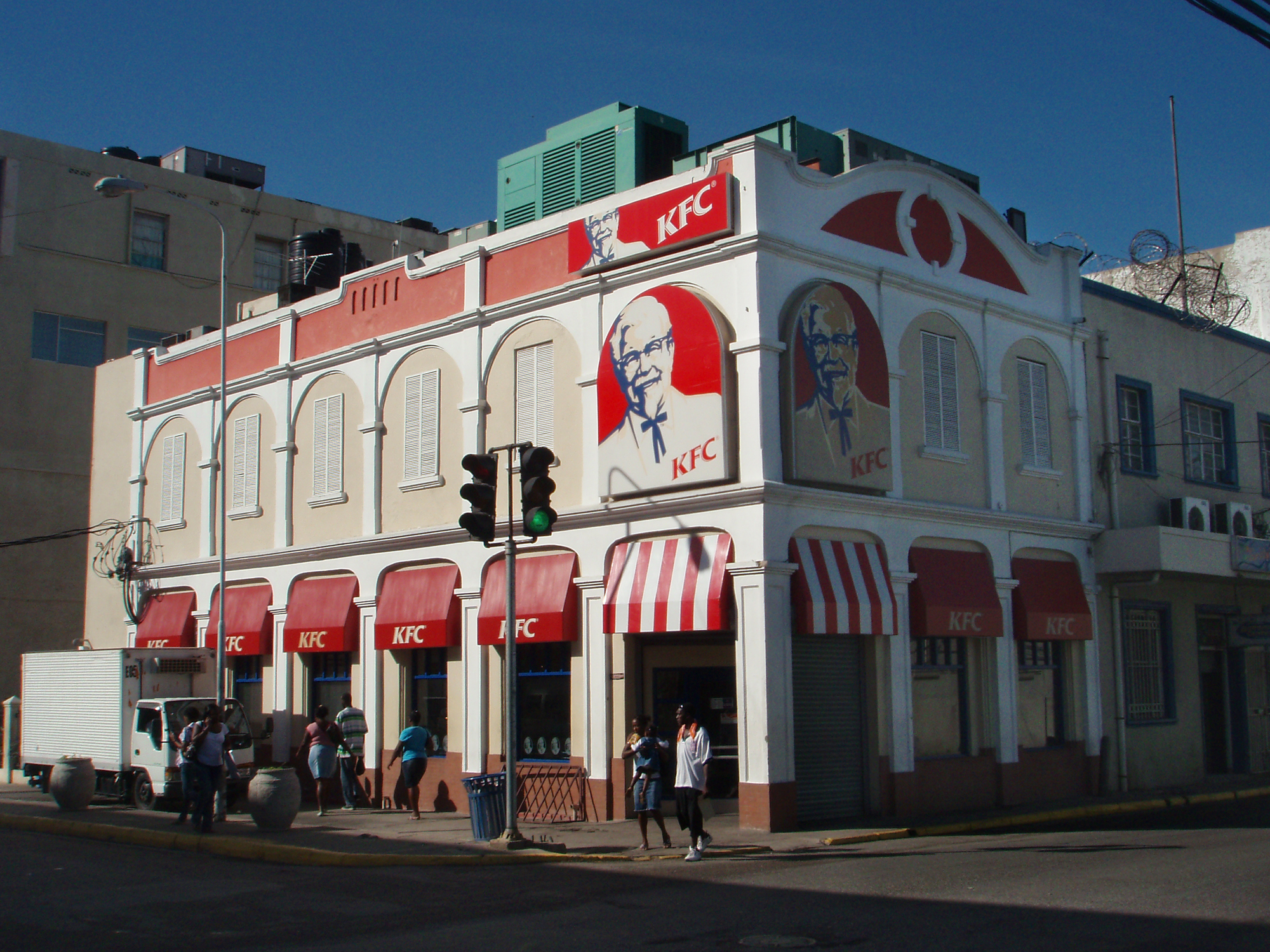
A KFC restaurant in Kingston, Jamaica

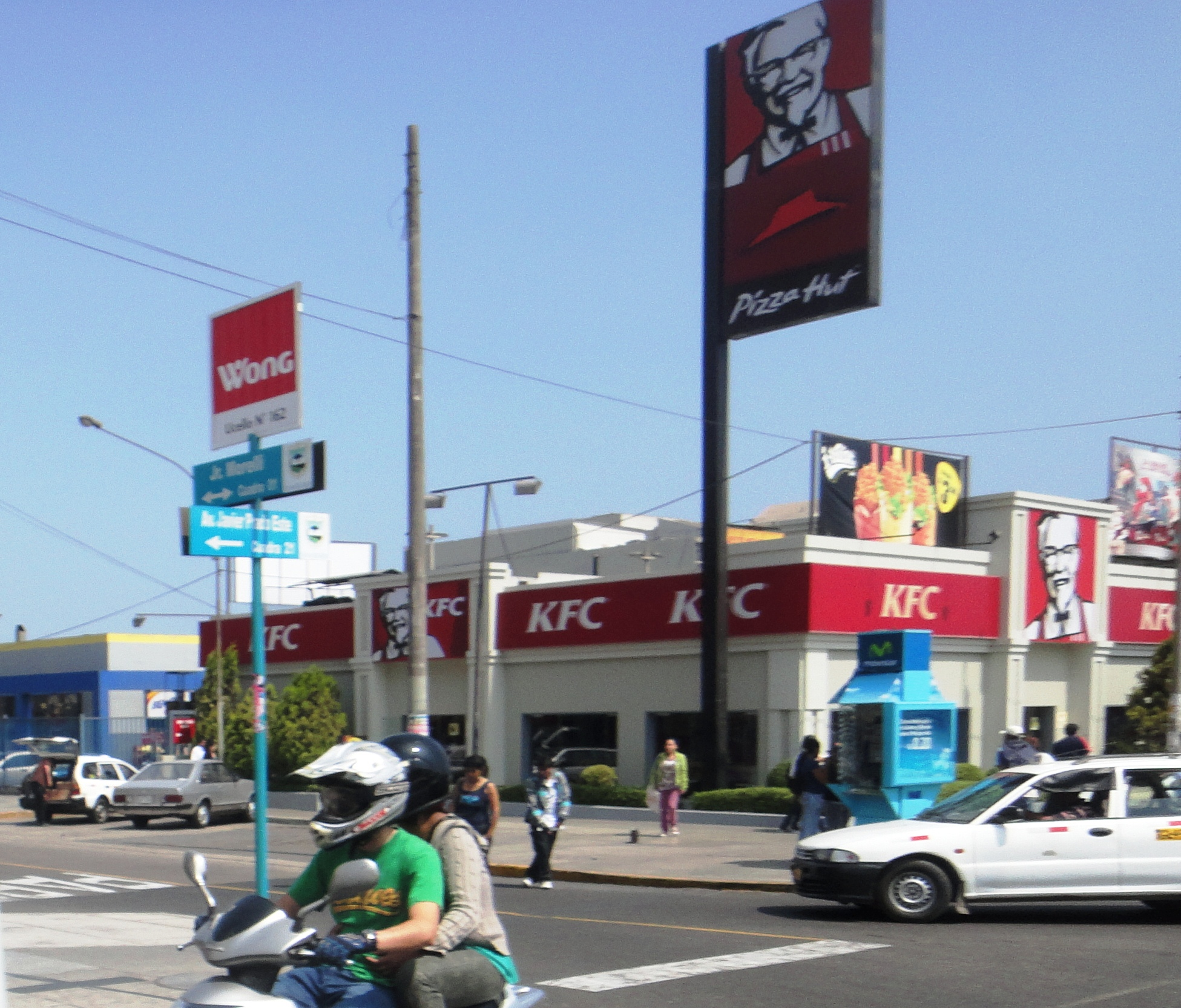
A KFC outlet in Lima, Peru

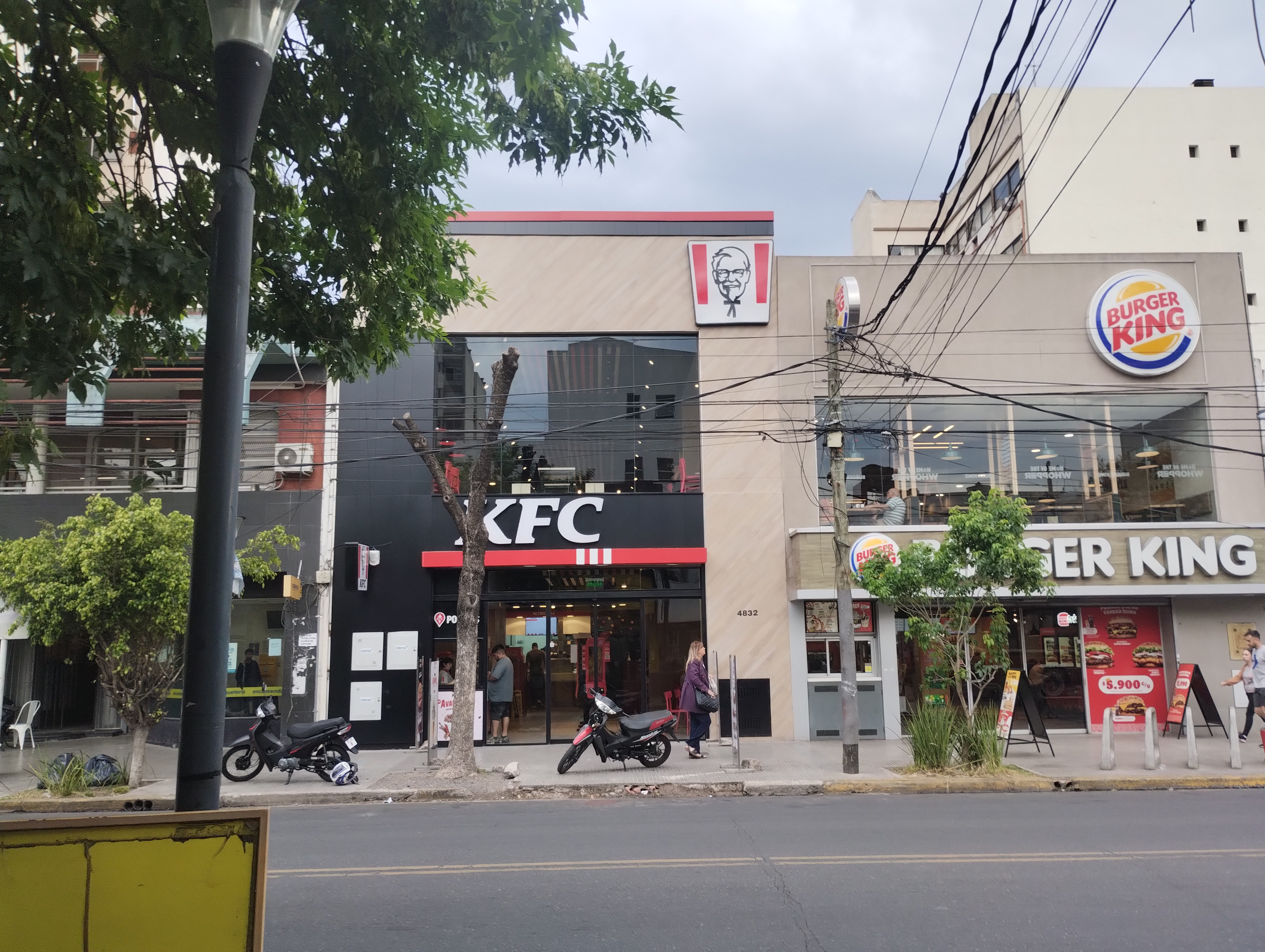
A KFC restaurant in Buenos Aires, Argentina

=== Europe ===
Country/region	Year entered	Outlets	First outlet	Owner/major operator	Notes
Albania	2016	11	Tirana	KAN	The first outlet in Albania opened in April 2016 at the Tirana East Gate Mall, with further expansion since. KFC was the first international fast food chain to enter Albania.
Armenia	2007	14	Yerevan	Derjava	
Austria	1970–1975, 2005	24	Vienna	Queensway Restaurants LtdAmRest	KFC first entered the country in 1970 but withdrew in 1975. Returned in 2005. 11 outlets as of 2022, with plans to expand to up to 50 the coming years.
Belarus	2015	91	?	Bel Food Service LLC, CreativeFood-S-Vostok LLC	
Belgium	2019	21	Brussels North Railway Station	Autogrill	The first Belgian KFC restaurant opened in June 2019.
Bosnia and Herzegovina	2022	6	Sarajevo	TASTRA	Biggest KFC drive-through in Southeast Europe. 3 outlets in Sarajevo, 1 in Mostar, 1 in Ilidža, 1 in Tuzla.
Bulgaria	1994	40	Sofia	Samex Ltd. and Amrest	KFC is the second international fast food brand in Bulgaria.
Croatia	2011	15	Zagreb	AmRest	There are 9 outlets in Zagreb, 2 in Split, 1 in Osijek, 1 in Pula, 1 in Varaždin and 1 in Zadar.
Cyprus	1994	26	?	CK Restaurant System Franchisers Ltd; PHC Franchised Restaurants Ltd	
Czech Republic	1994/1995	138	Vodičkova street, Prague	AmRest	
Denmark	1973, 2026	1	Aarhus	Isken ApS (until 2025); Nordic Service Partners (2026-present)	Following food-safety violations, Yum! Brands ended its franchise agreement with Isken ApS in June 2025, closing all 11 outlets. Rights were late transferred to Nordic Service Partners, which opened its first outlet at Field's in Copenhagen in June 1, 2026.
Estonia	2019	10	Ülemiste centre	Apollo Group OÜ	KFC opened its first restaurant in Estonia on October 24, 2019.
Finland	2021	8	Itis, Helsinki	Apollo Group	KFC's first restaurant was opened in Itäkeskus, Helsinki on November 11, 2021.
France	1991–1992, 2001	402	Villiers-en-Bière	KFC France	Opened in 1991, but all seven stores were closed by 1992. Returned in 2001.
Germany	1968	216	Hansaallee, Frankfurt	KFC GB Ltd	KFC in Germany struggled to reach 12 stores by 1995. There are plans to expand to up to 500 outlets in the next five to seven years.
(Georgia (country)) Georgia	2014	20	?	?	20 outlets. First outlet opened December 25, 2014.
Greece	1992	22	Piraeus	Food Plus	The first outlet opened near Athens.
Hungary	1992	106	Király Street, Budapest	AmRest	The first outlet was the first Central European KFC in a post-communist country. The previous master franchise holder was Hemingway Holding AG.
Iceland	1980	8	Hafnarfjörður	KFC ehf	The first outlet opened on October 9, 1980.
(Republic of Ireland) Ireland	1971	35	Phibsborough	KFC (GB) Ltd	Major franchisees include MBCC Foods and Herbel Restaurants (Ireland) Ltd.
Isle of Man	2002–2016; 2022	1	Douglas		Closed its only outlet on November 30, 2016. Reopened in 2022 as a drive-through restaurant.
Italy	1975, 2014	159	Naples (1975), Rome (2014)	KFC® Italy Srl	First outlet opened in 1975, but since closed. Returned on November 21, 2014. See KFC Italia.
Jersey	?	1	St Helier		
Kosovo	2016	13	Pristina	KAN	First outlet opened in September 2016 at Albi Mall, with outlets now in various other cities. KFC was the first international fast food chain to enter Kosovo.
Latvia	2015	8	Riga	Cibus Group (until 2019); Apollo Group	First outlet opened on August 28, 2015.
Lithuania	2007	12	Kaunas	Cibus Group (until 2019); Apollo Group	First location opened in Kaunas Akropolis shopping mall in 2007 with Pizza Hut. The restaurant bankrupted in 2011. First location in Vilnius opened in 2009 in OZAS shopping mall with Pizza Hut
Luxembourg	2024	2	Belval	Autogrill	The first outlet opened in Belval Plaza Shopping Centre in Esch-Belval on October 2, 2024.
Malta	1997	4	?	The Farsons Group	The outlets are located in Mosta, Malta International Airport, St.Julian's and Gzira.
Moldova	2008	4	Chișinău	US Food Network	First opened in MallDova mall. 3 outlets.
Netherlands	1972	96	Rotterdam	KFC Netherlands	The Headquarters are in Amsterdam-Zuidoost. 82 (+1 in Bonaire by other operator) outlets by July 2022.
North Macedonia	2018	8	?	KAN International	The outlets are in Skopje, Tetovo, Struga and Strumica.
Norway	1980, 2026	1	Storo	Apollo Group	KFC tried to open in Frognerstranda in the 1980s, but was closed soon after. The new first KFC in Norway will open in Storo on November 23, 2026.
Poland	1992	315	?	AmRest	
Portugal	1994	82	?	Grupo Ibersol	
Romania	1997	112	Bucharest	Sphera Franchise Group	First opened in Magheru Blvd. Opened on April 17, 1997. See KFC Romania
Serbia	2007	24	Belgrade	AmRest	There are 11 outlets in Belgrade, 2 in Novi Sad, 1 in Niš, 1 in Kragujevac, 1 in Subotica, 1 in Kruševac, and 4 on various motorways.
Slovakia	2005	17	Trnava	Queensway Restaurants Slovakia	
Slovenia	2006	5	A1 highway near Maribor	AmRest	
Spain	1970	307	?	AmRest	
Sweden	1981, 2015	25	Lockarp	Nordic Service Partners	First opened in 1981, but soon withdrew. Returned in 2015 with the first outlet opened near Malmö with a drive-through in November 2015.
Switzerland	1980–2004, 2017	17	Geneva	Kentucky Fried Chicken (Great Britain) Ltd.	Present from 1980 until 2004, but since closed. Returned in 2017 with the first store opened at the main railway station in Geneva on December 5, 2017.
Turkey	1989–2025, 2025	36	Istanbul	KFC Turkey	In January 2025 Yum! Brands terminated its franchise agreement with İş Gıda. In September of the same year, HD Holding returned by opening its first branch in Historia AVM on November 19, 2025, after purchasing the franchising rights.
Ukraine	2012	72	Kyiv	Global Restaurant Group	In 1999–2006 the chain was working with Russian ownership under the name Rostic's. The first KFC was opened in Kyiv. The outlets are in the cities of Kyiv, Kharkiv, Dnipro, Lviv, Odesa, Pavlohrad, Vinnytsia, Cherkasy, Zhytomyr, Kryvyi Rih and Sumy.
United Kingdom	1965 (England); 1992 (Northern Ireland); 1994 (Scotland); 1999 (Wales)	994	Preston	KFC GB Ltd	First KFC market in Europe. The largest KFC in Europe and the fifth largest worldwide. 860 locations in England, 60 in Scotland, 43 in Wales and 31 in Northern Ireland.

==== Gallery ====
The following is a gallery of KFC outlets in European countries.
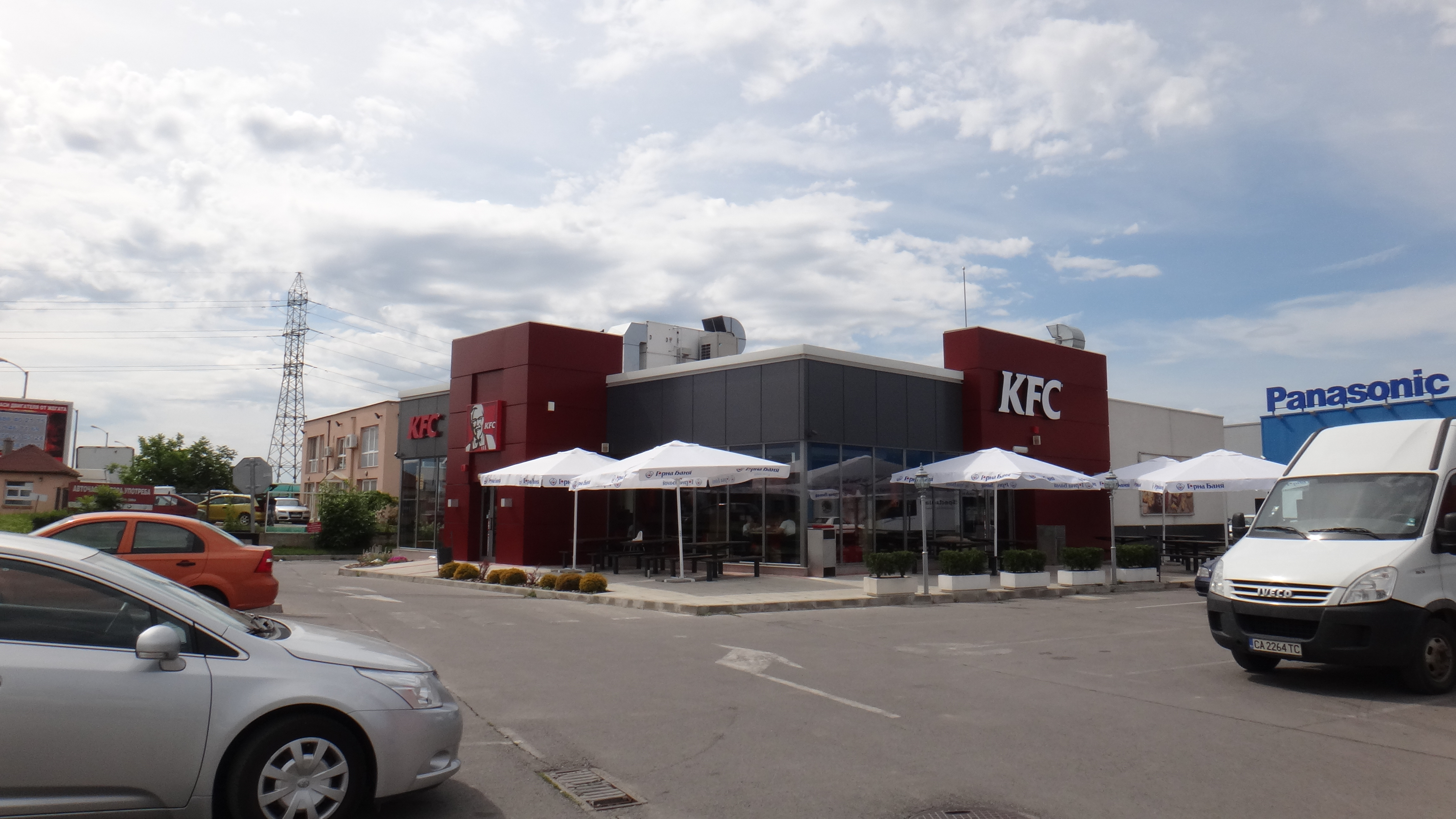
A KFC restaurant in Sofia, Bulgaria

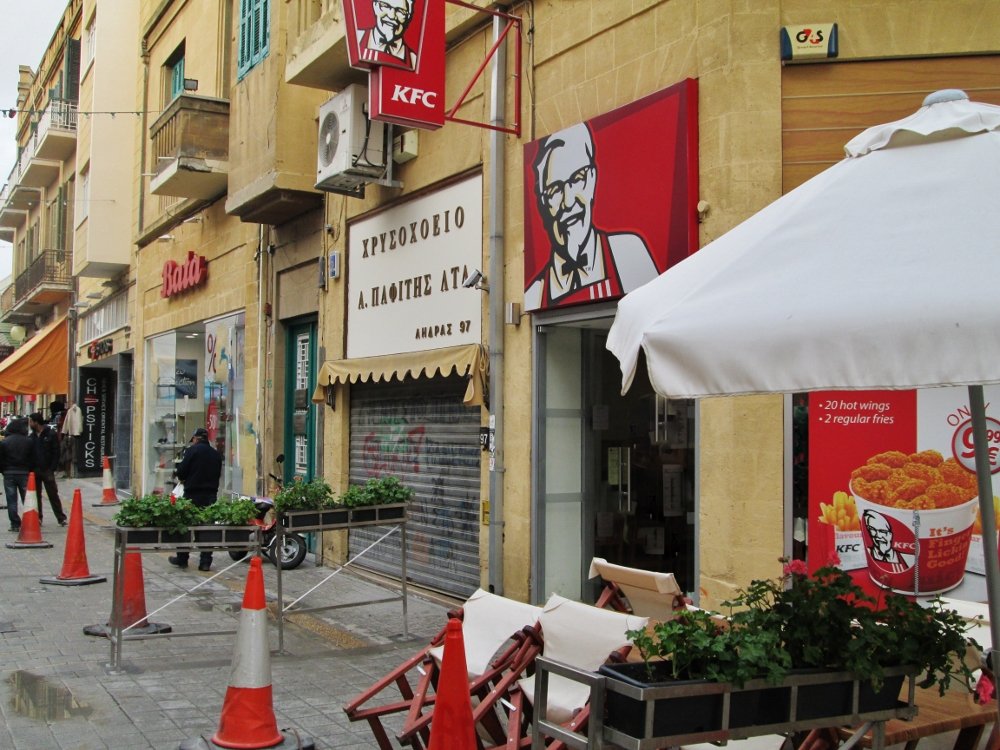
A KFC restaurant in Nicosia, Cyprus

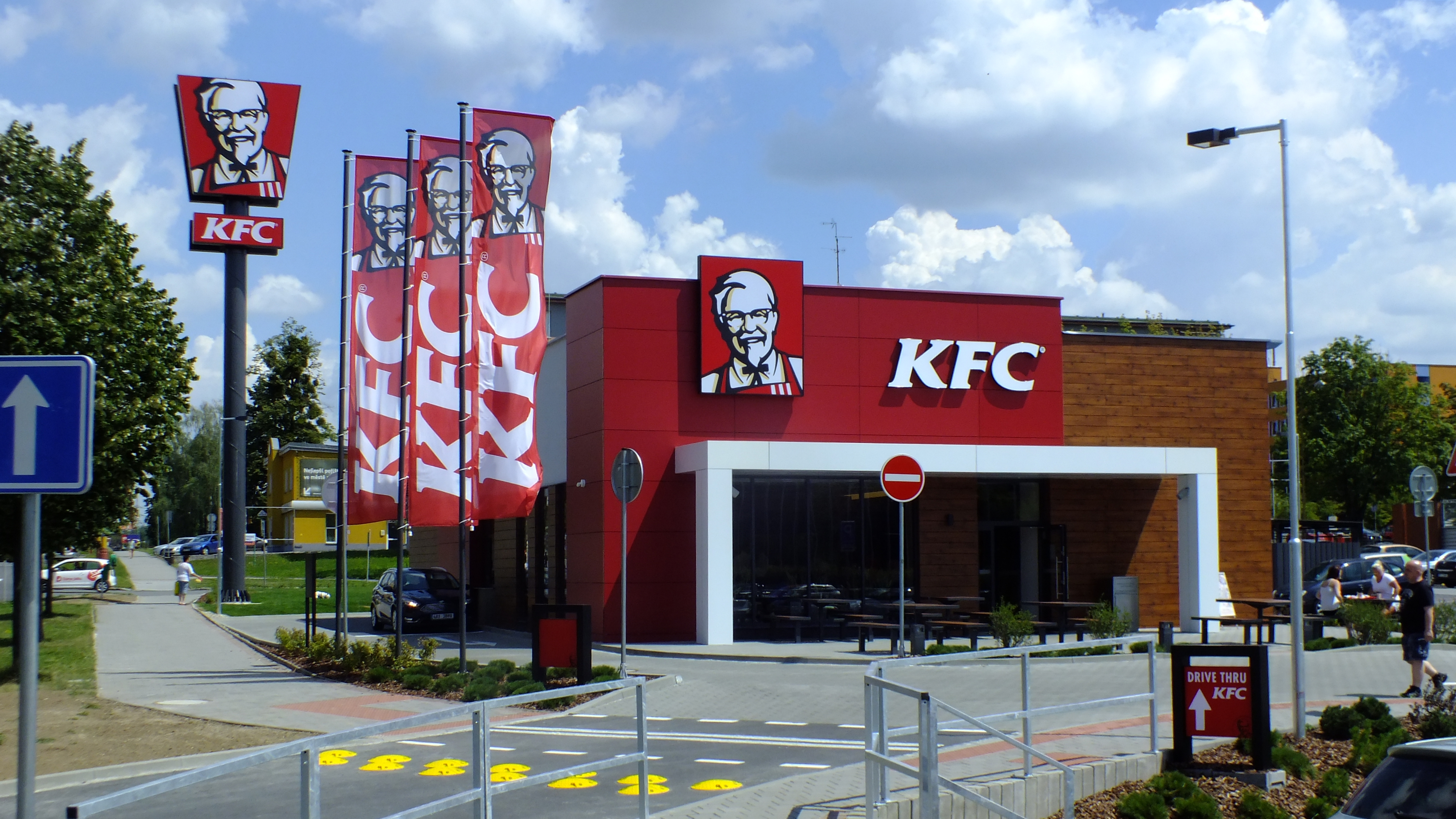
A KFC restaurant in Havířov, Czech Republic

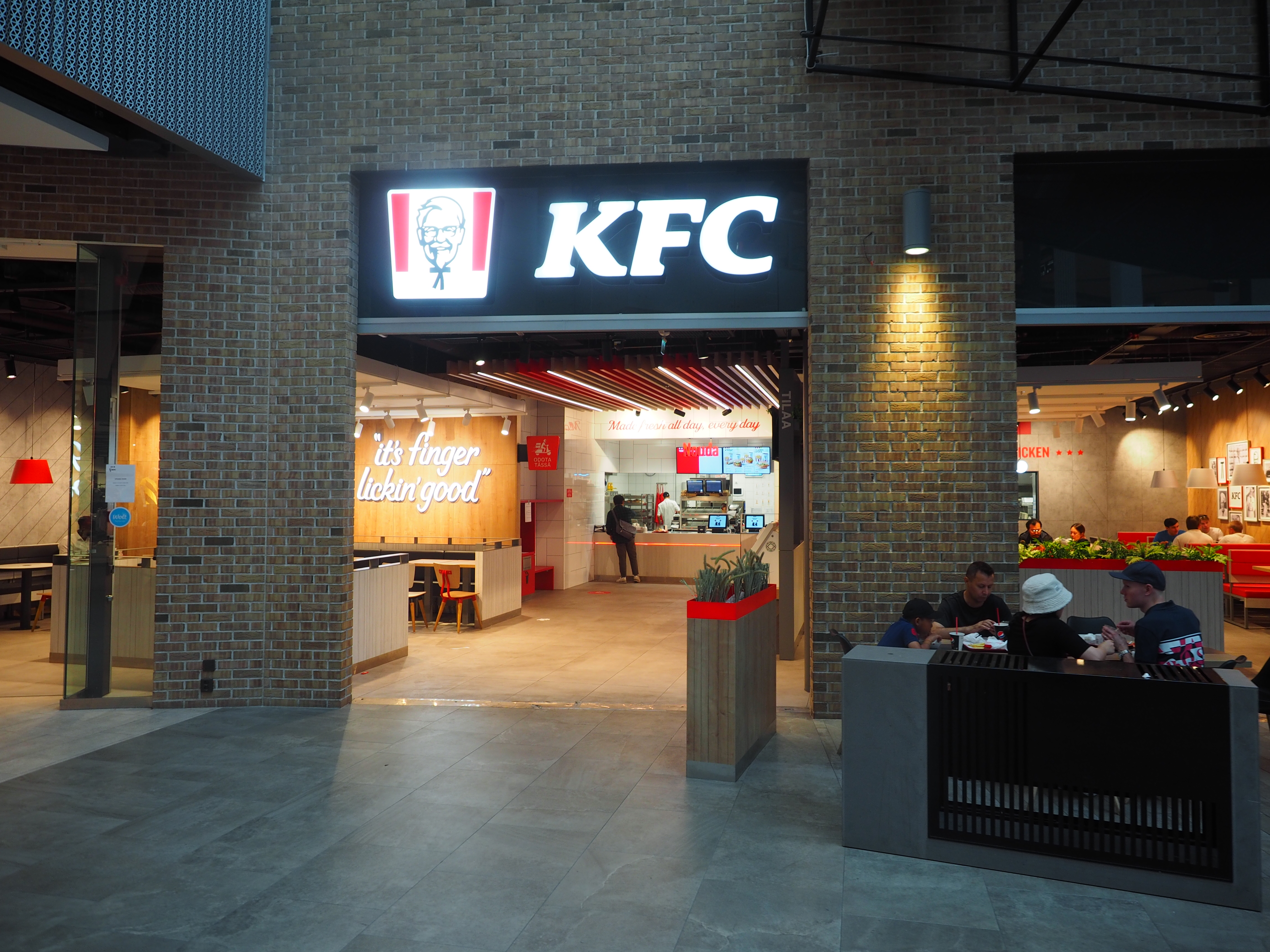
A KFC restaurant in Espoo, Finland

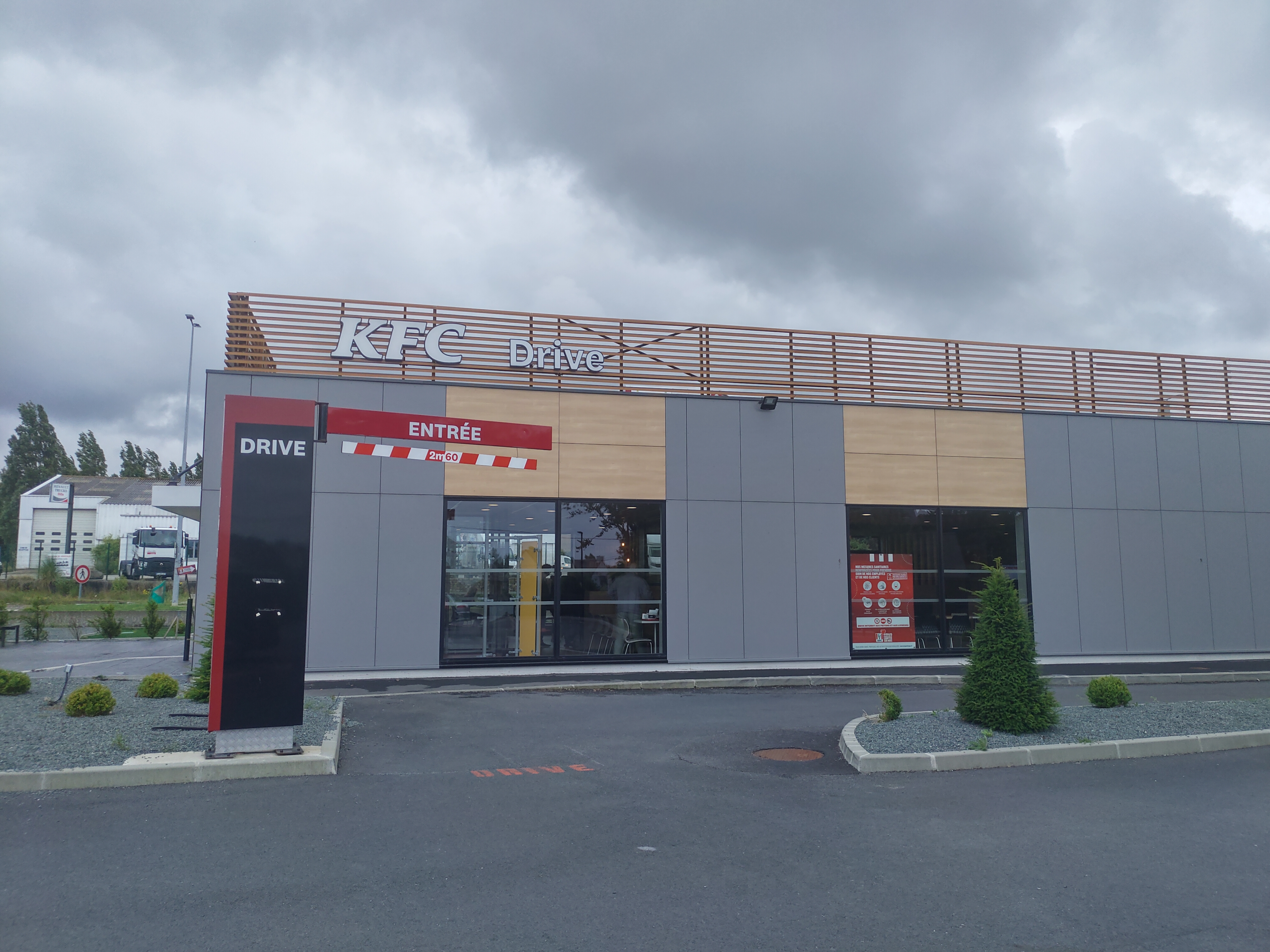
A KFC in Cherbourg, France

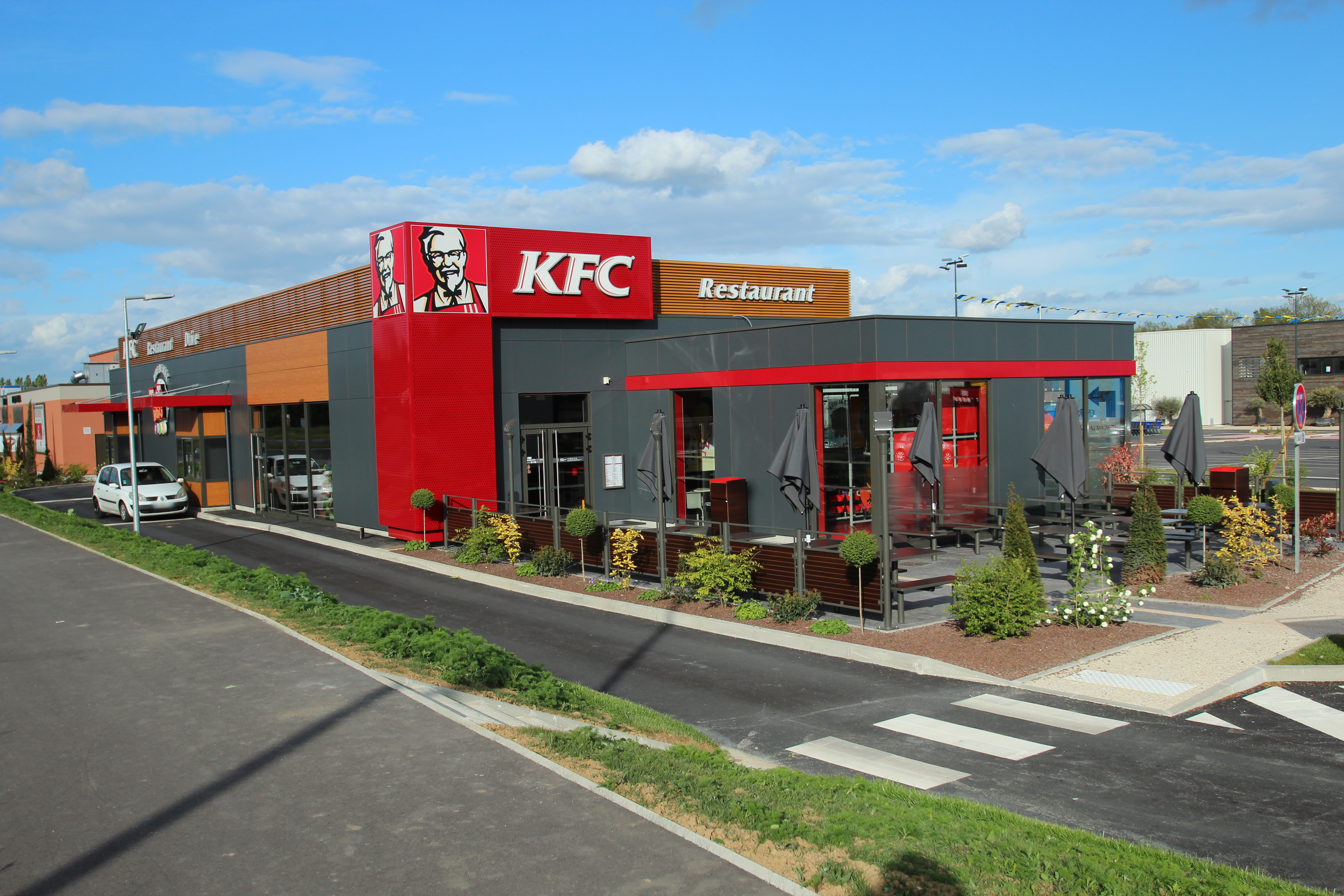
A KFC restaurant in Les Ulis, France

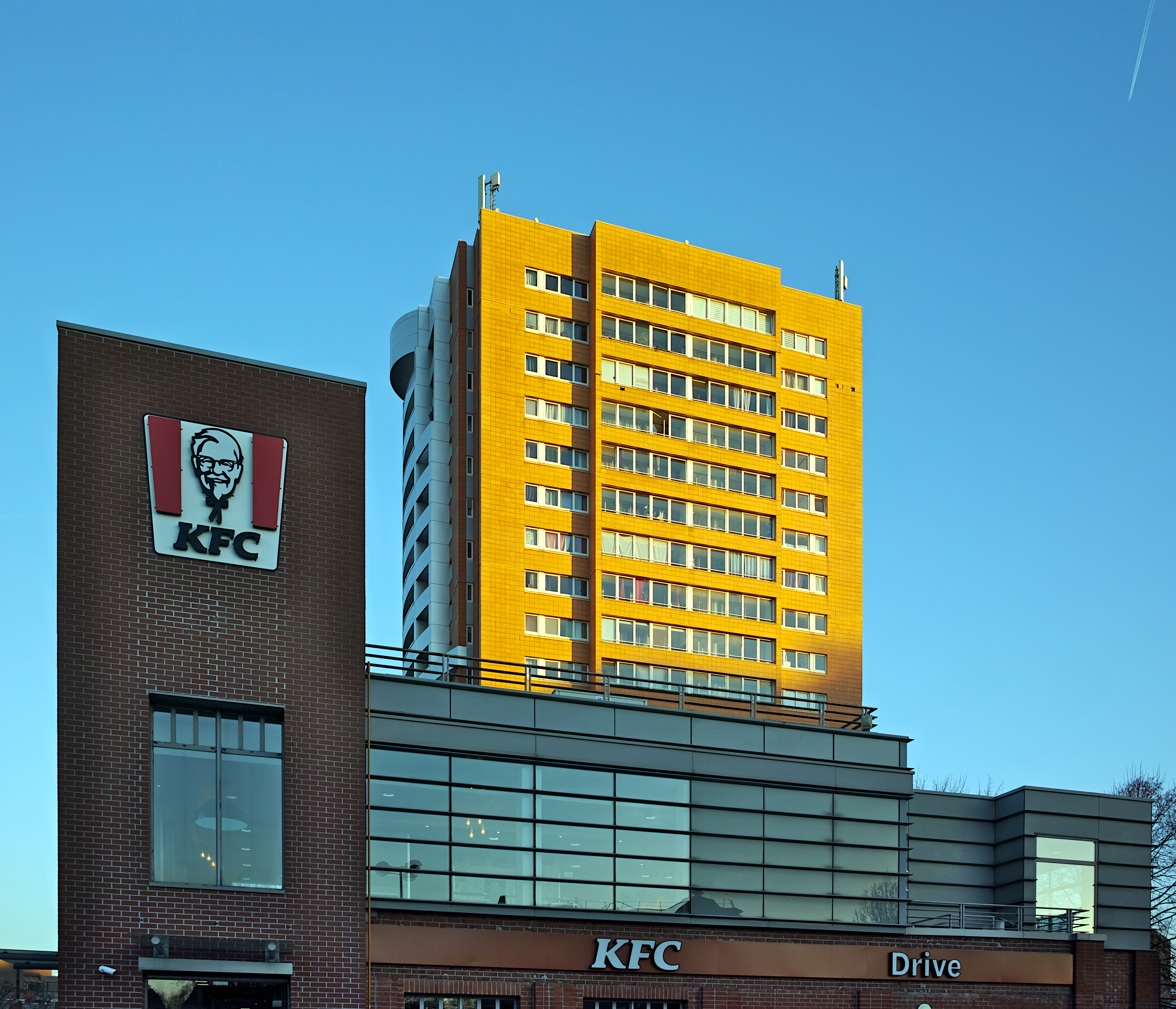
A KFC in Roubaix, France

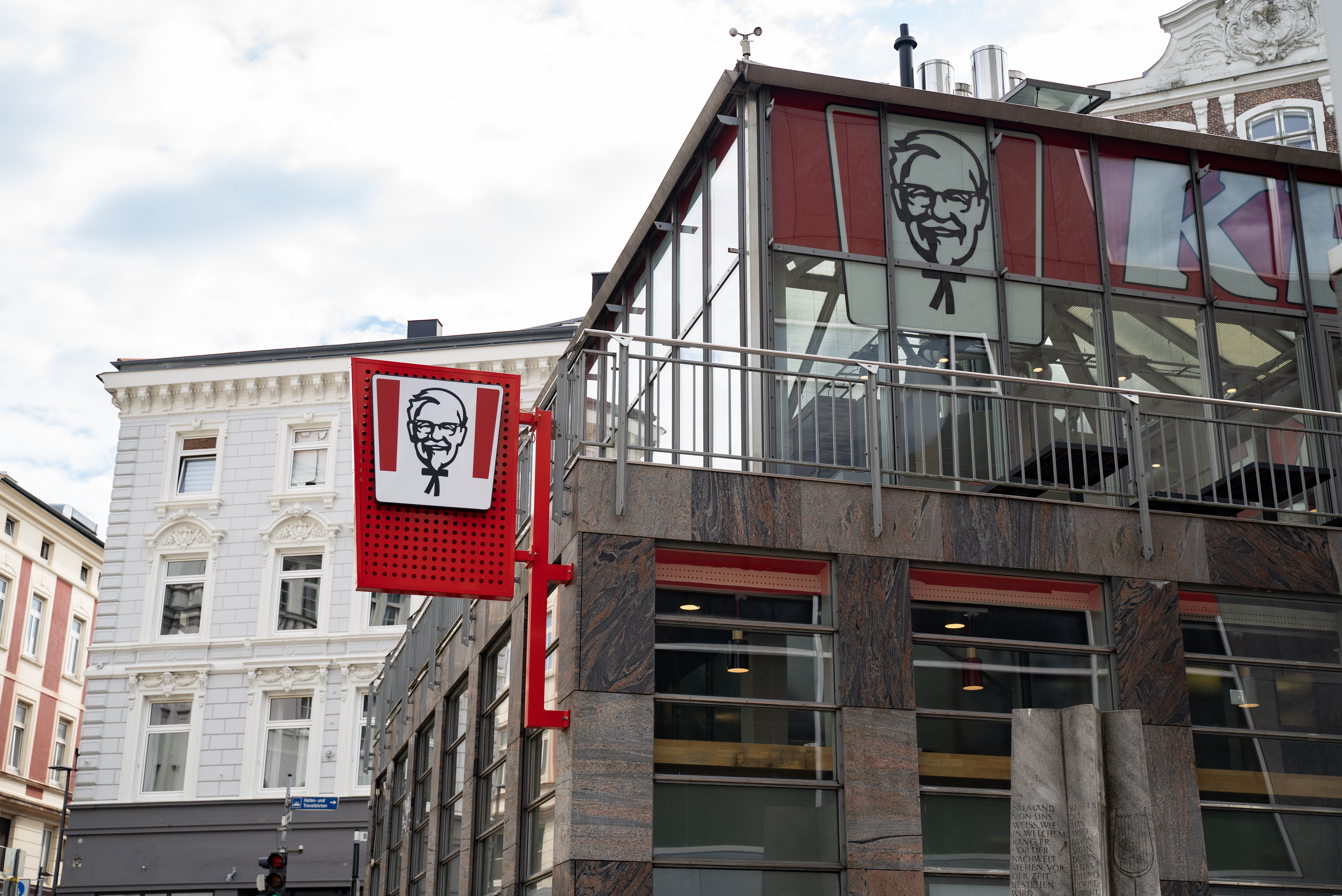
A KFC in Lübeck, Germany

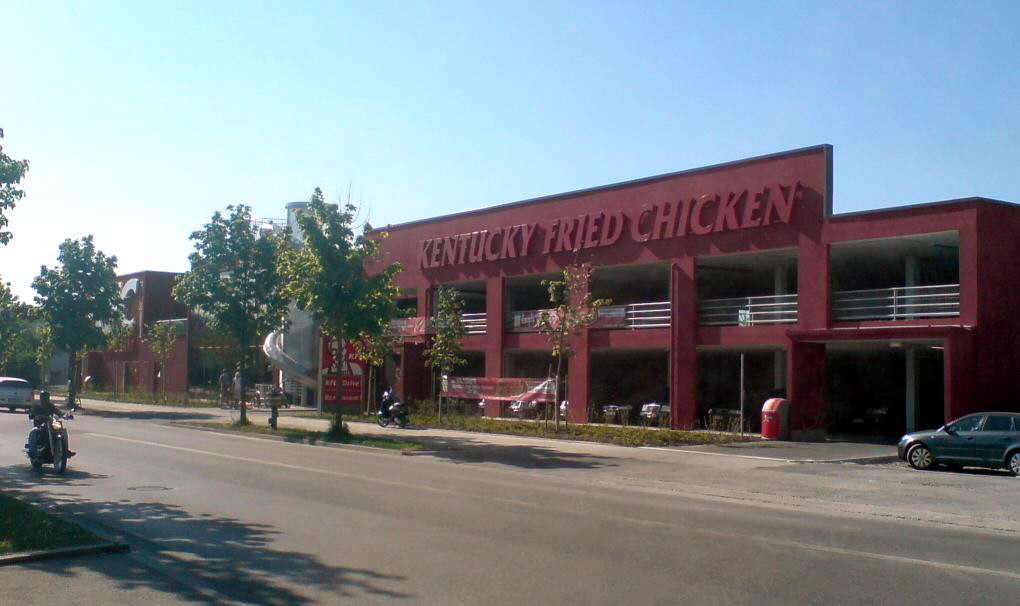
A KFC restaurant in Munich, Germany. It was claimed to be the biggest KFC in the world when it was opened.

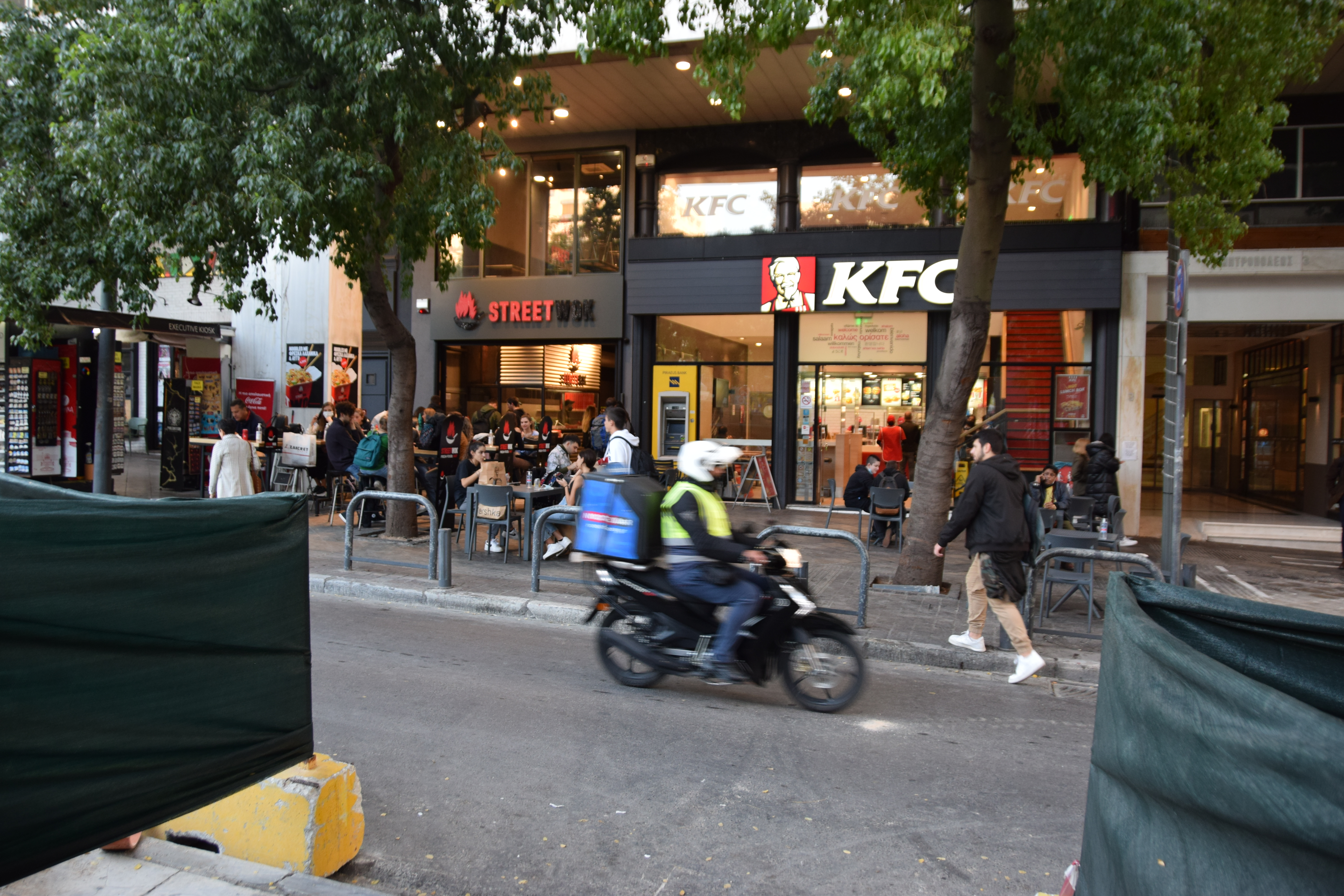
A KFC restaurant in Athens, Greece

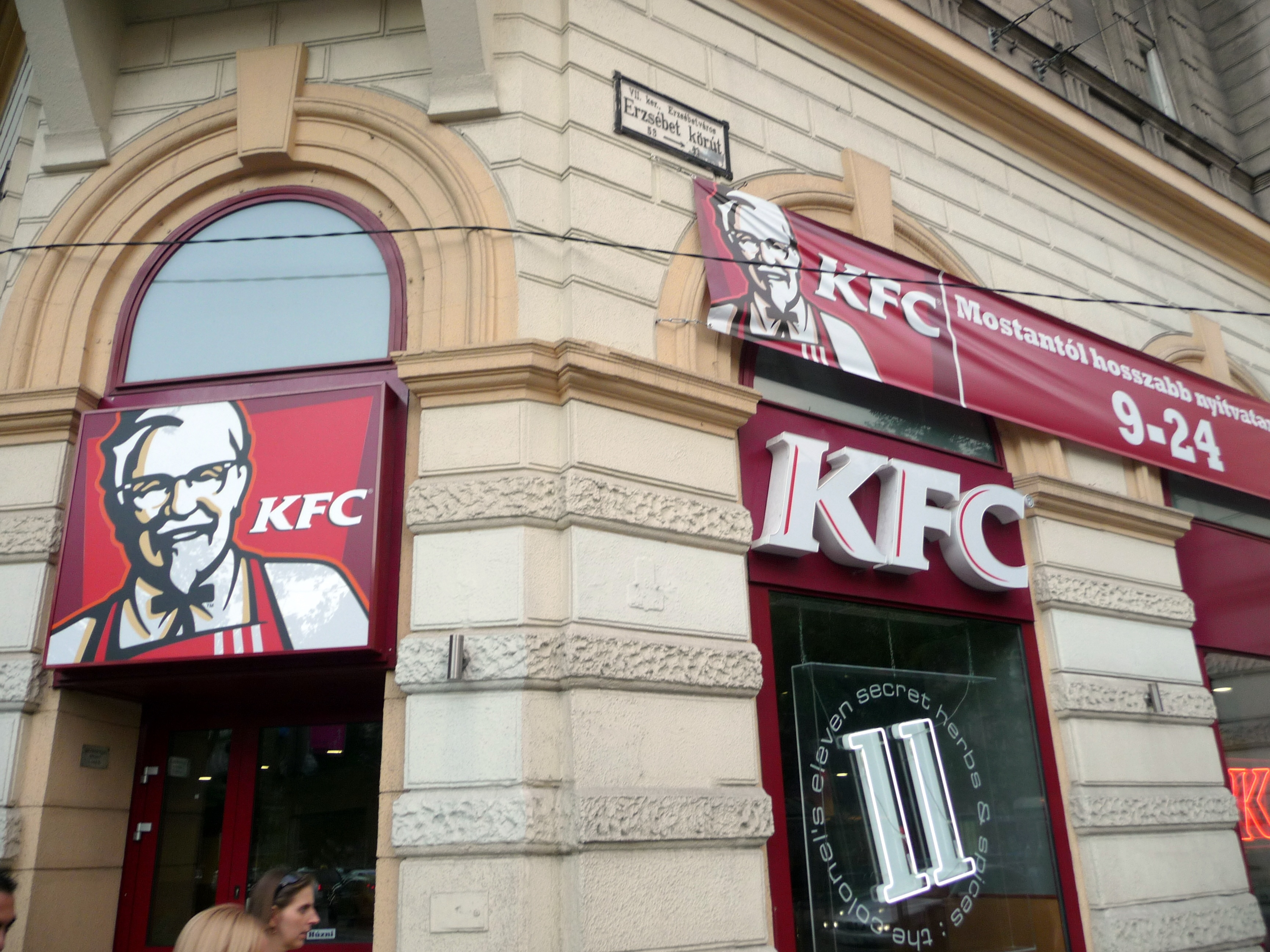
A KFC restaurant in Budapest, Hungary

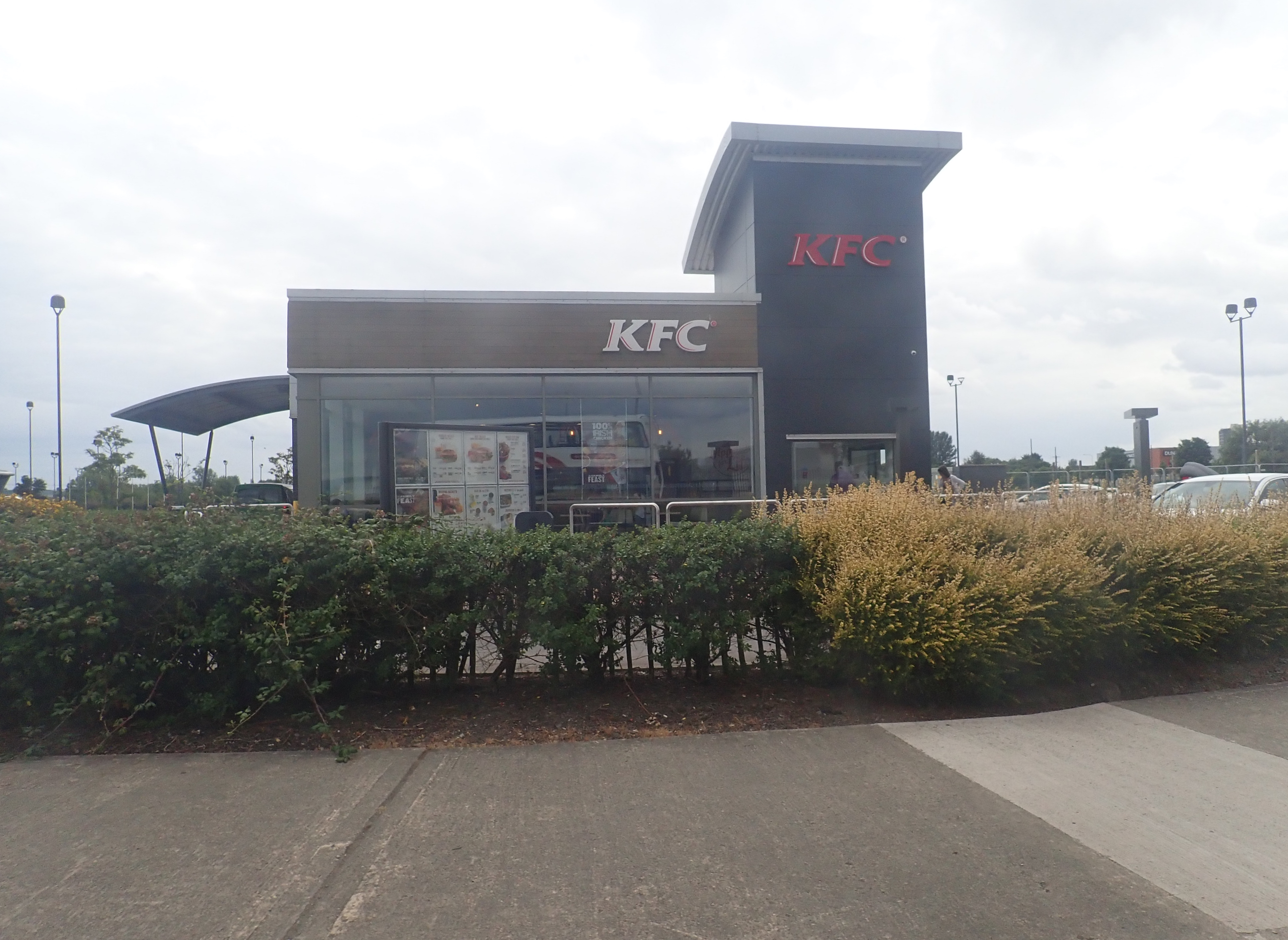
A KFC restaurant in Dundalk, Ireland

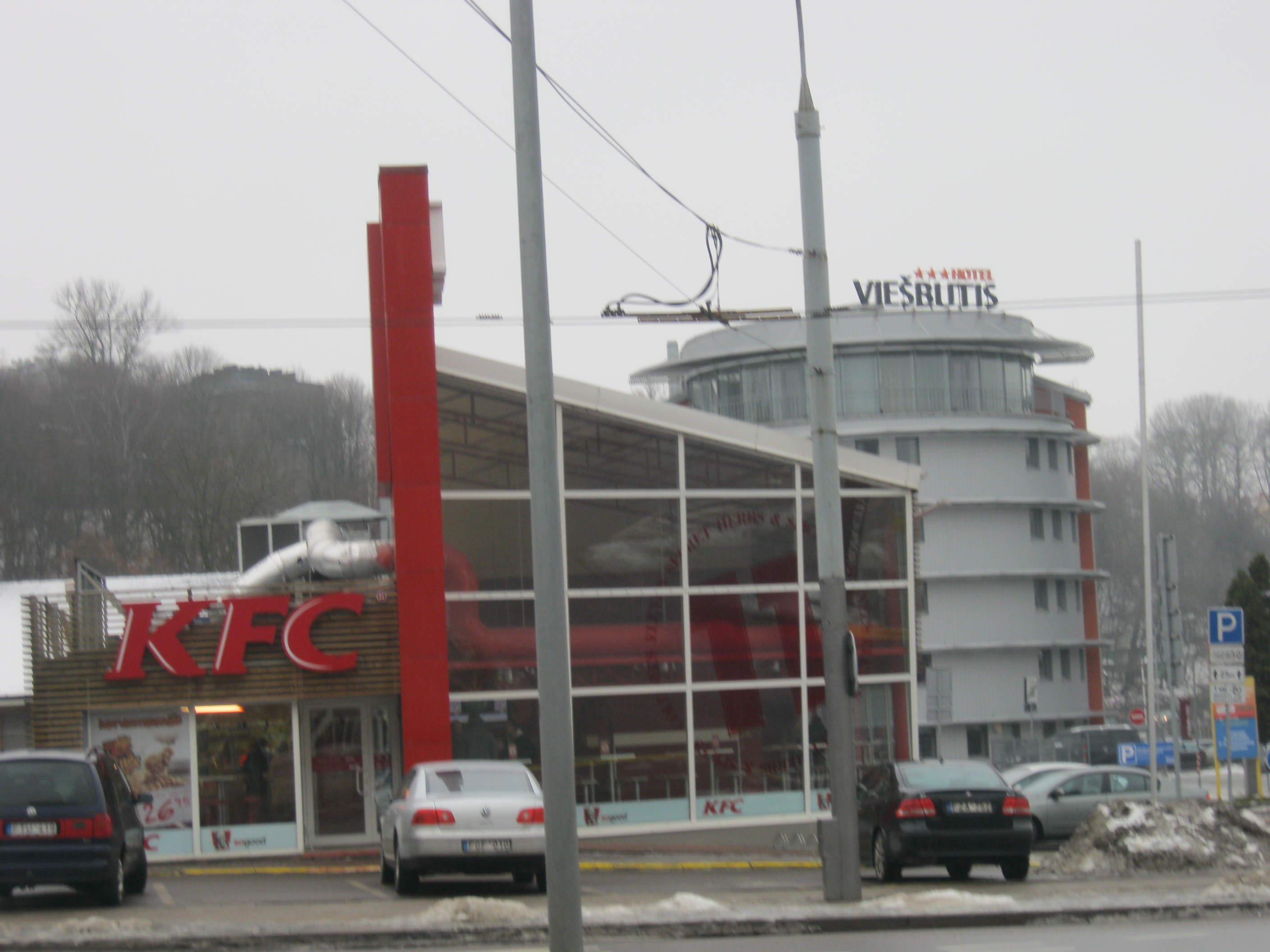
A KFC restaurant in Vilnius, Lithuania

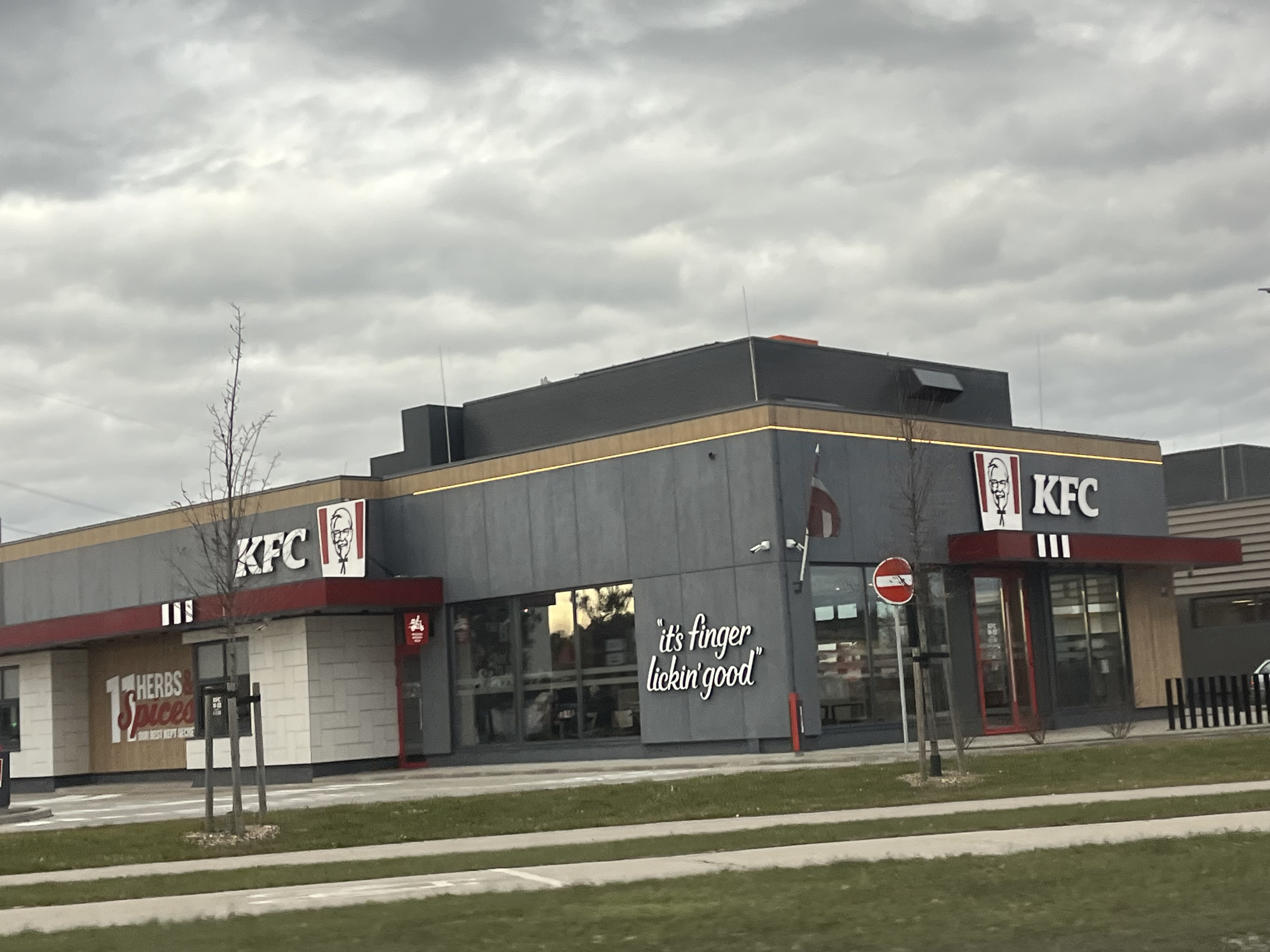
A KFC restaurant in Riga, Latvia

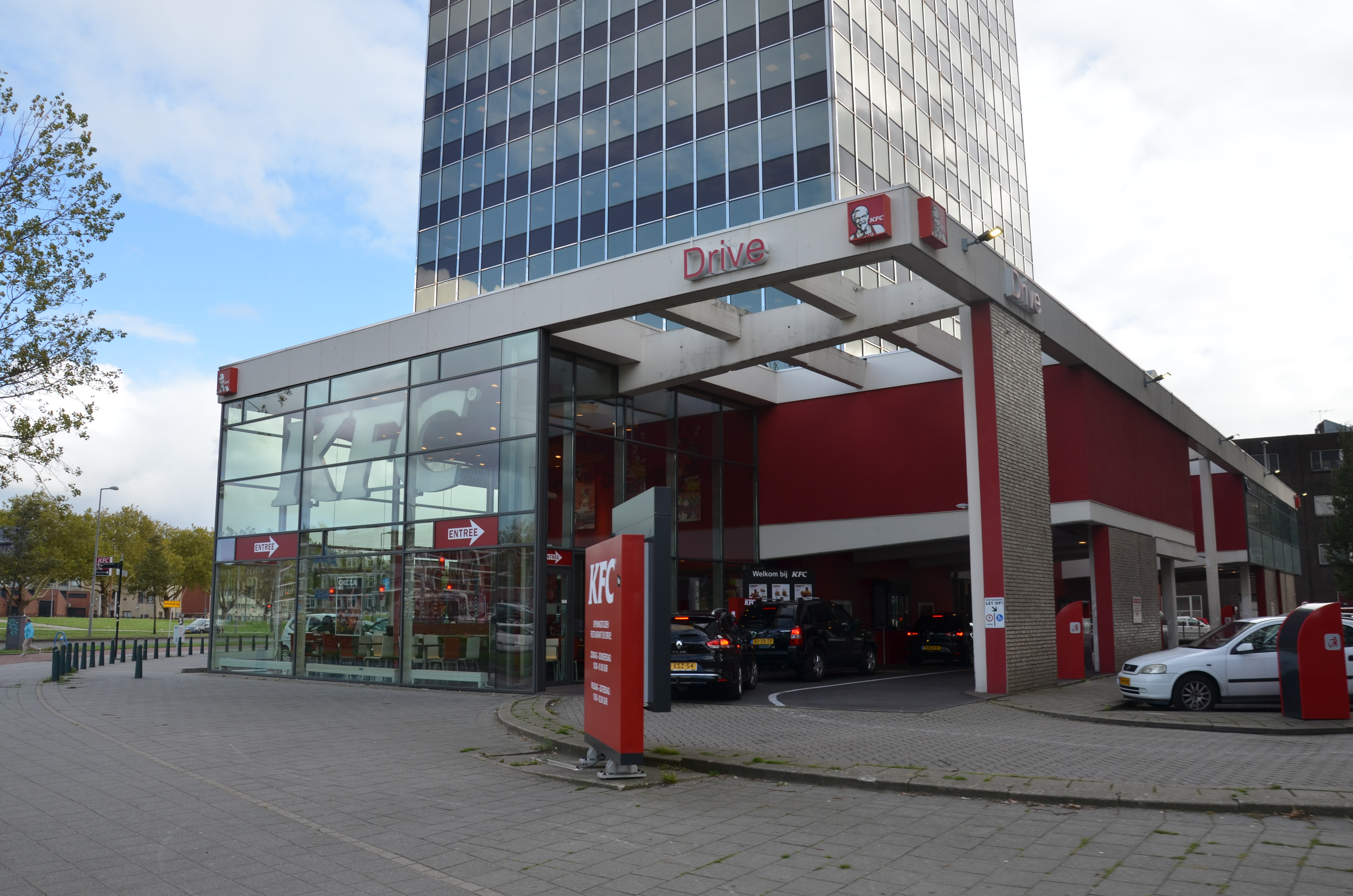
A KFC restaurant with drive-through in Rotterdam, Netherlands

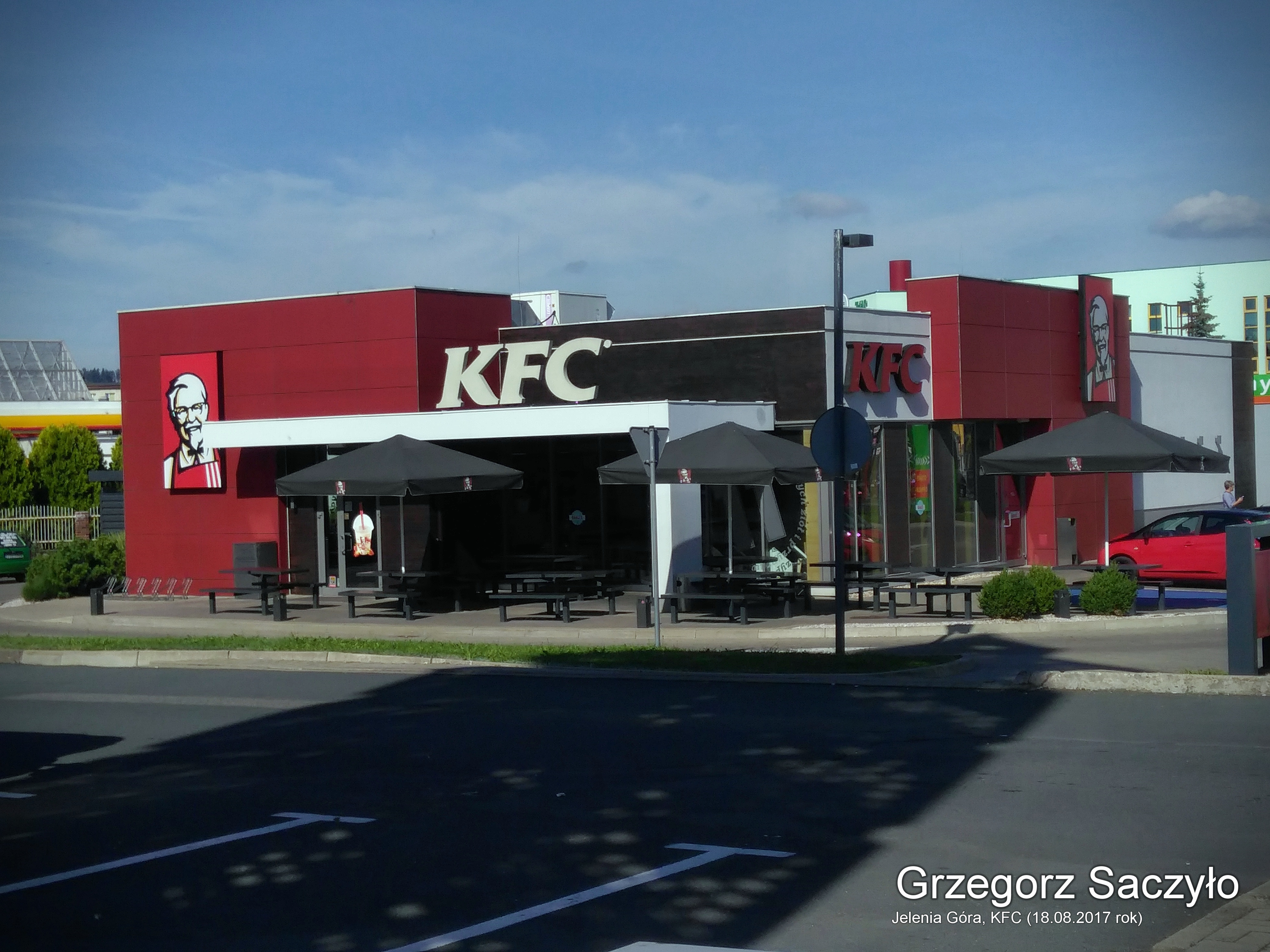
A KFC restaurant in Jelenia Góra, Poland

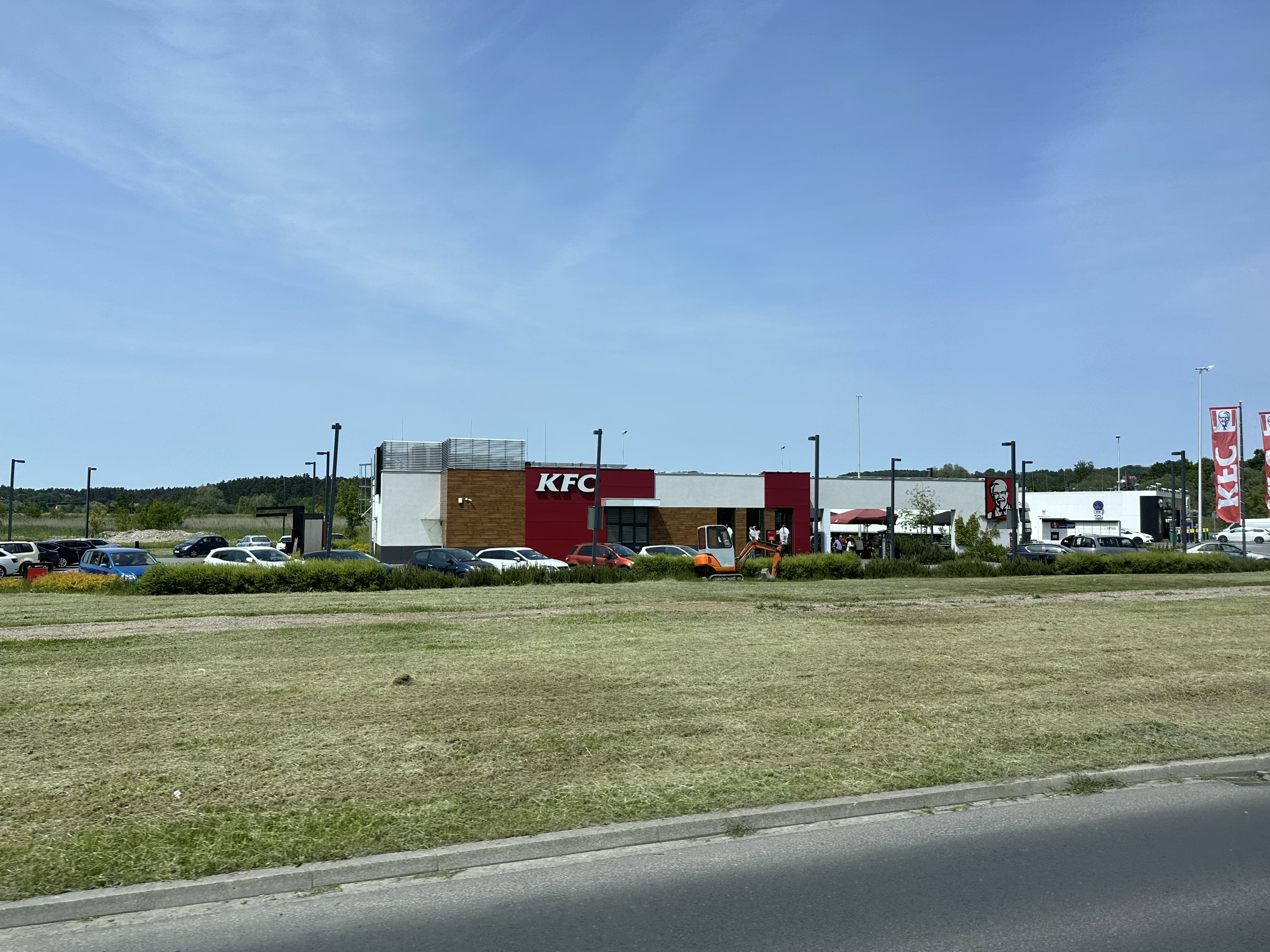
KFC in Kraków, Poland

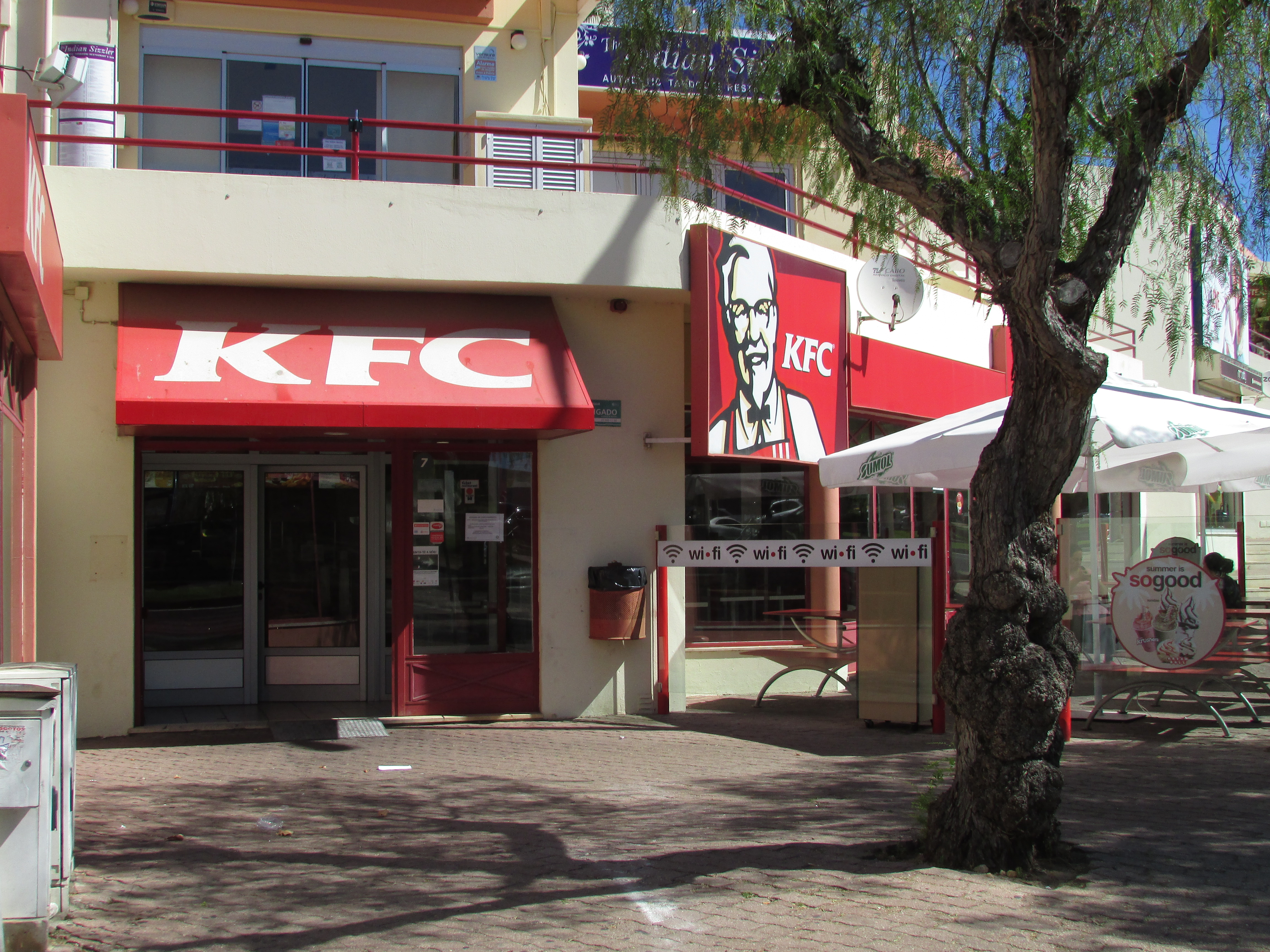
A KFC outlet in Albufeira, Portugal

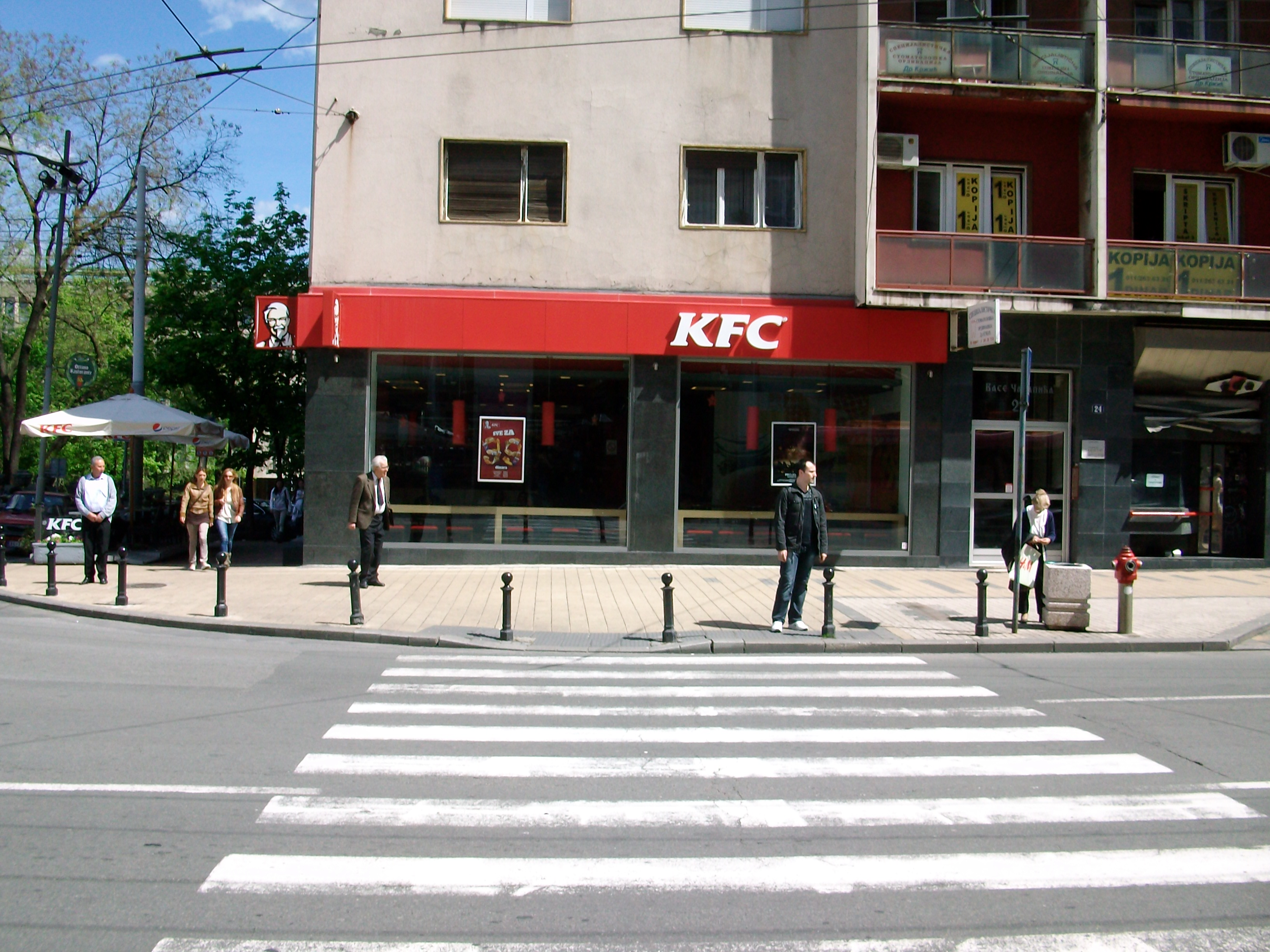
A KFC outlet in Belgrade, Serbia

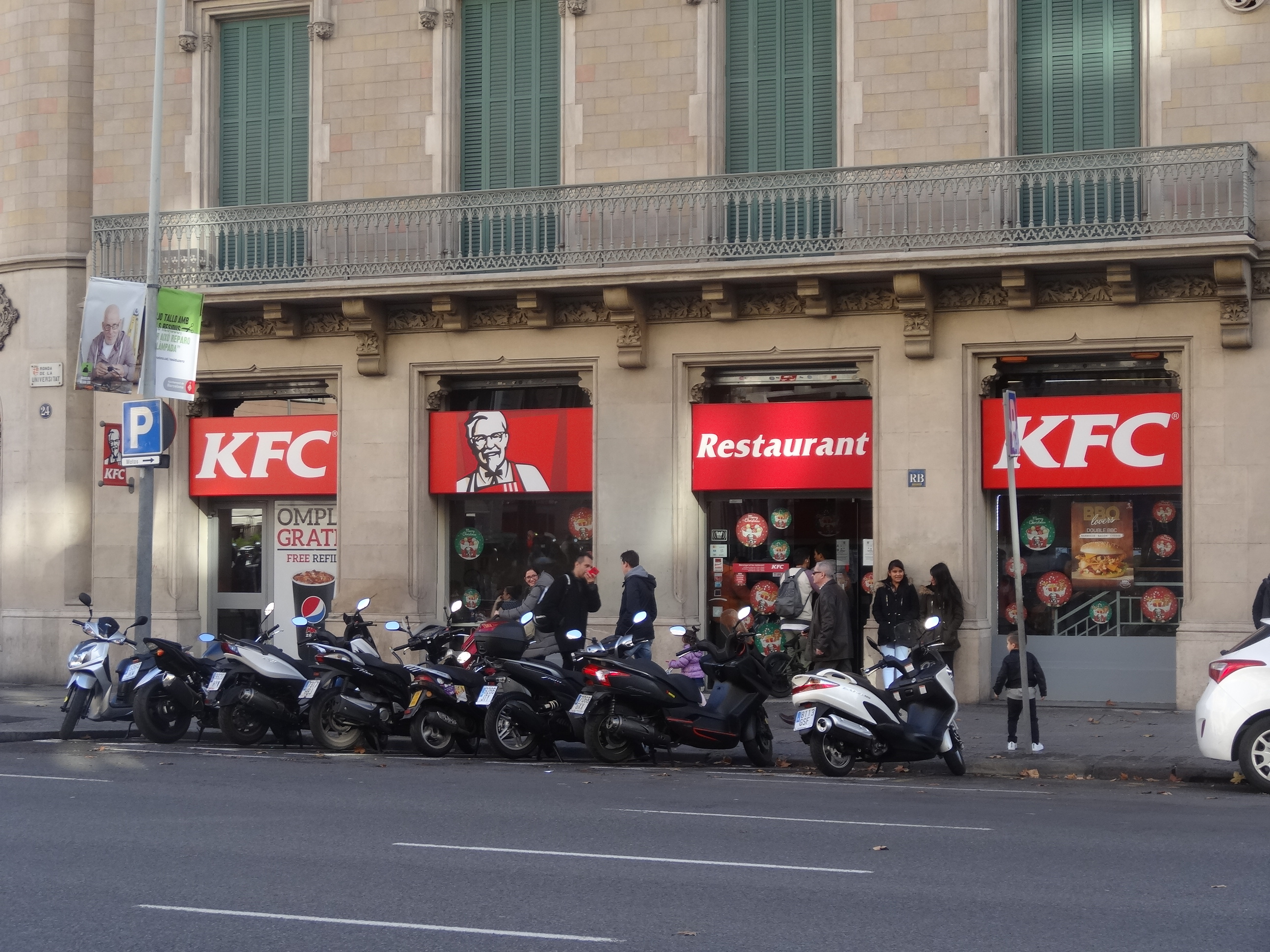
A KFC restaurant at Barcelona, Spain

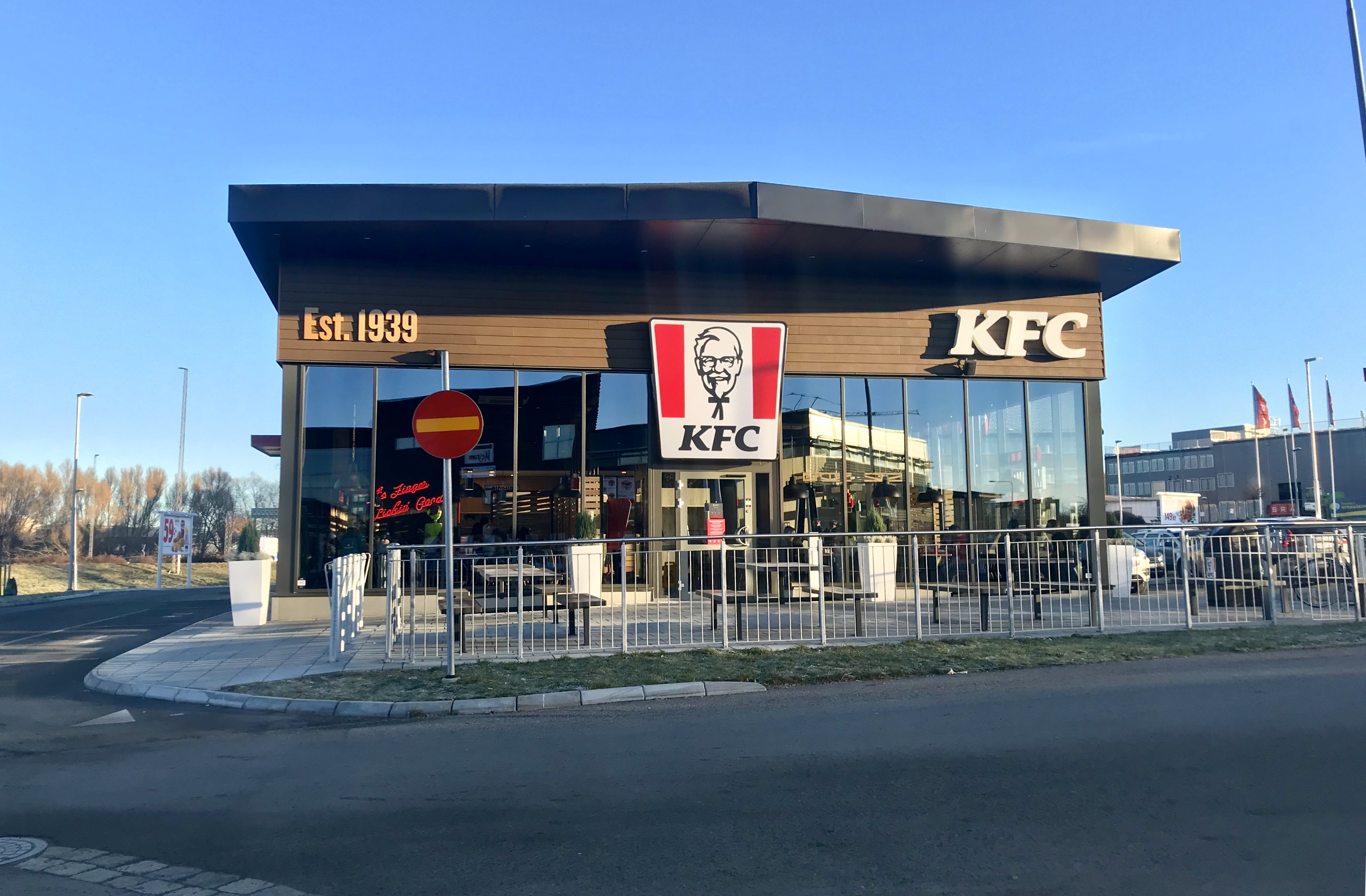
A KFC in Mölndal, Sweden

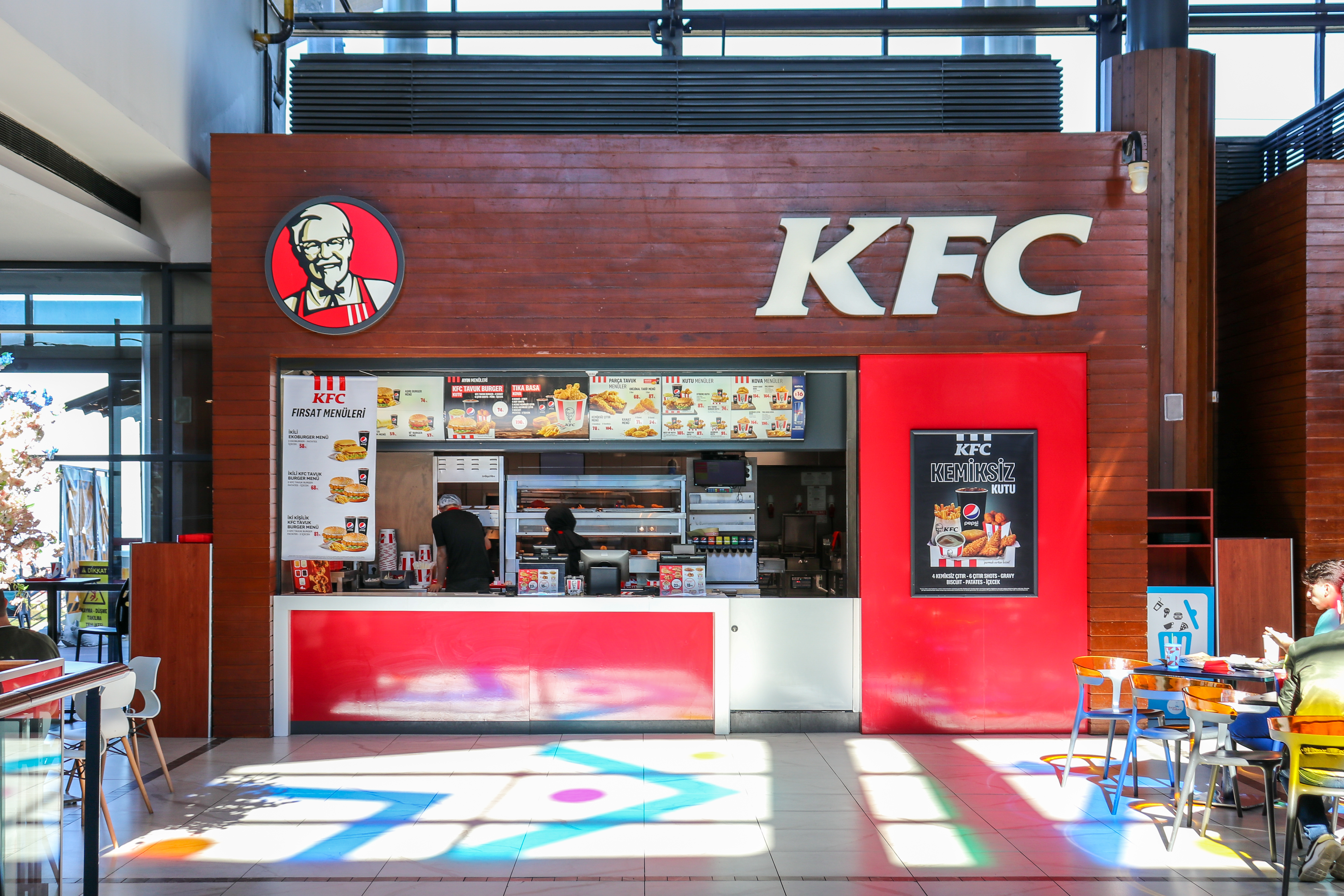
A KFC restaurant in Trabzon, Turkey

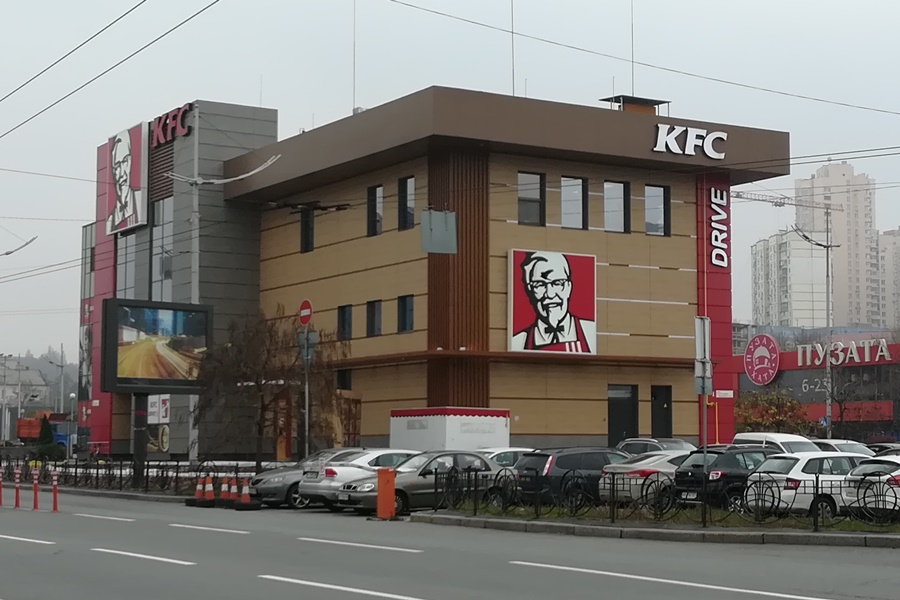
A KFC restaurant in Kyiv, Ukraine

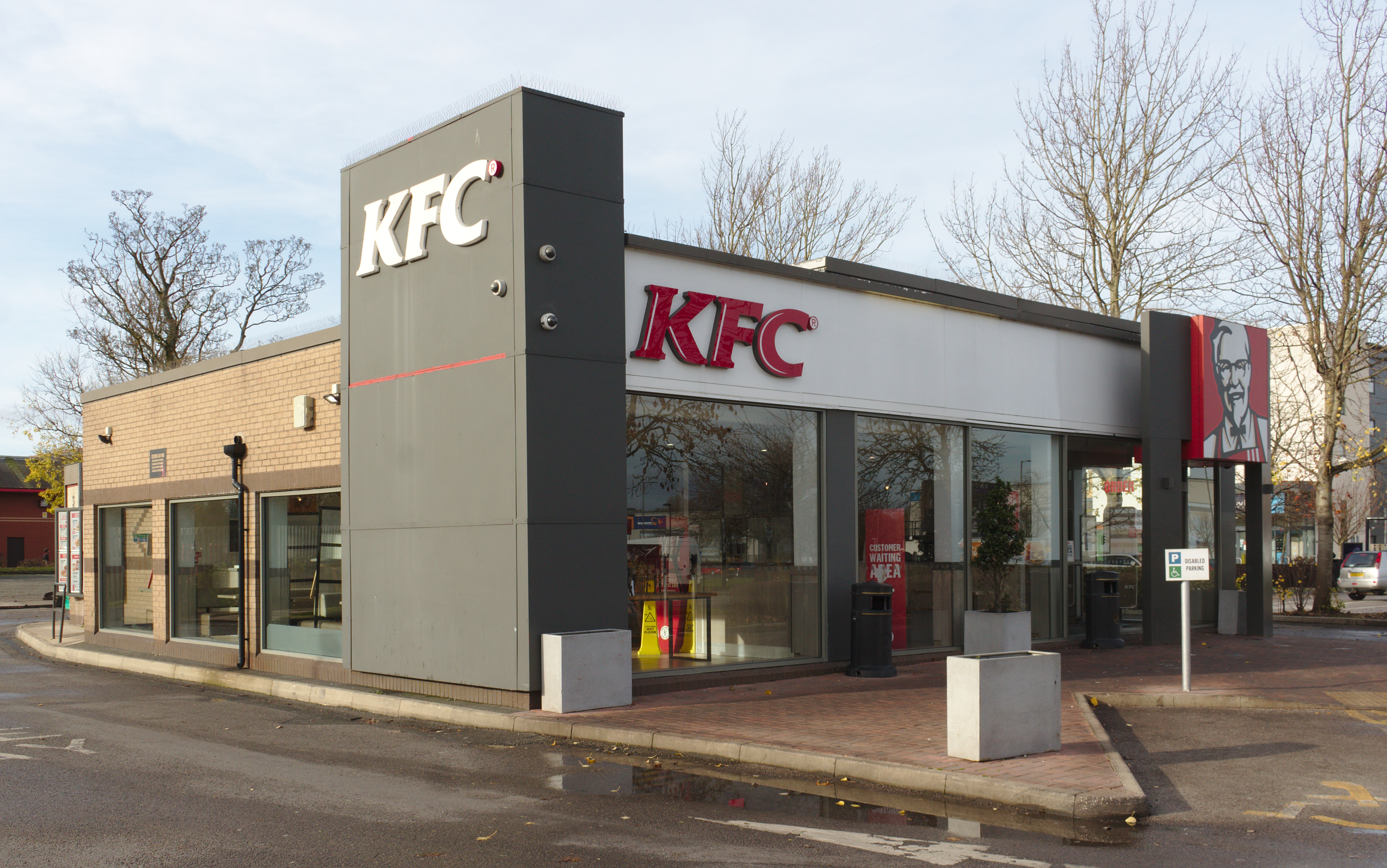
A KFC restaurant in Croxteth, United Kingdom

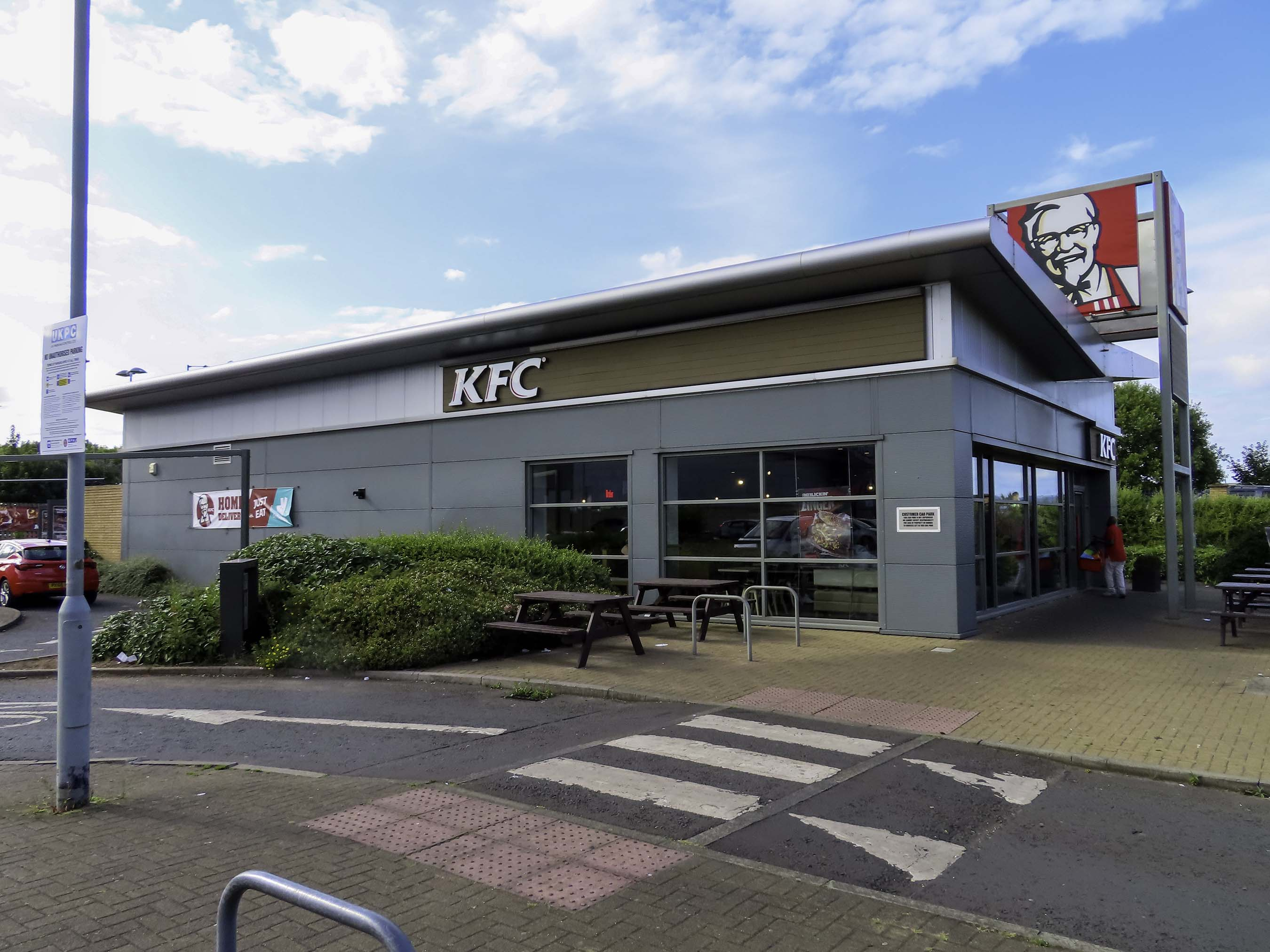
A KFC by Edmiston Drive, Glasgow, United Kingdom

=== North America ===
Country/region	Year entered	Outlets	First outlet	Owner/major operator	Notes
Bermuda	1975	1	Queen Street, Hamilton	KFC Bermuda	
United States	1930	4,213	Salt Lake City, Utah	Yum! Brands	The franchise first opened in 1952
Mexico	1963	393	Monterrey, Nuevo León	Premium Restaurant Brands	
Canada	1953	639	Calgary	Yum Restaurants International (Canada)	Known as Poulet Frit Kentucky (PFK) in the province of Quebec, due to its language laws regarding French.

==== Gallery ====
The following is a gallery of KFC outlets in North American countries.
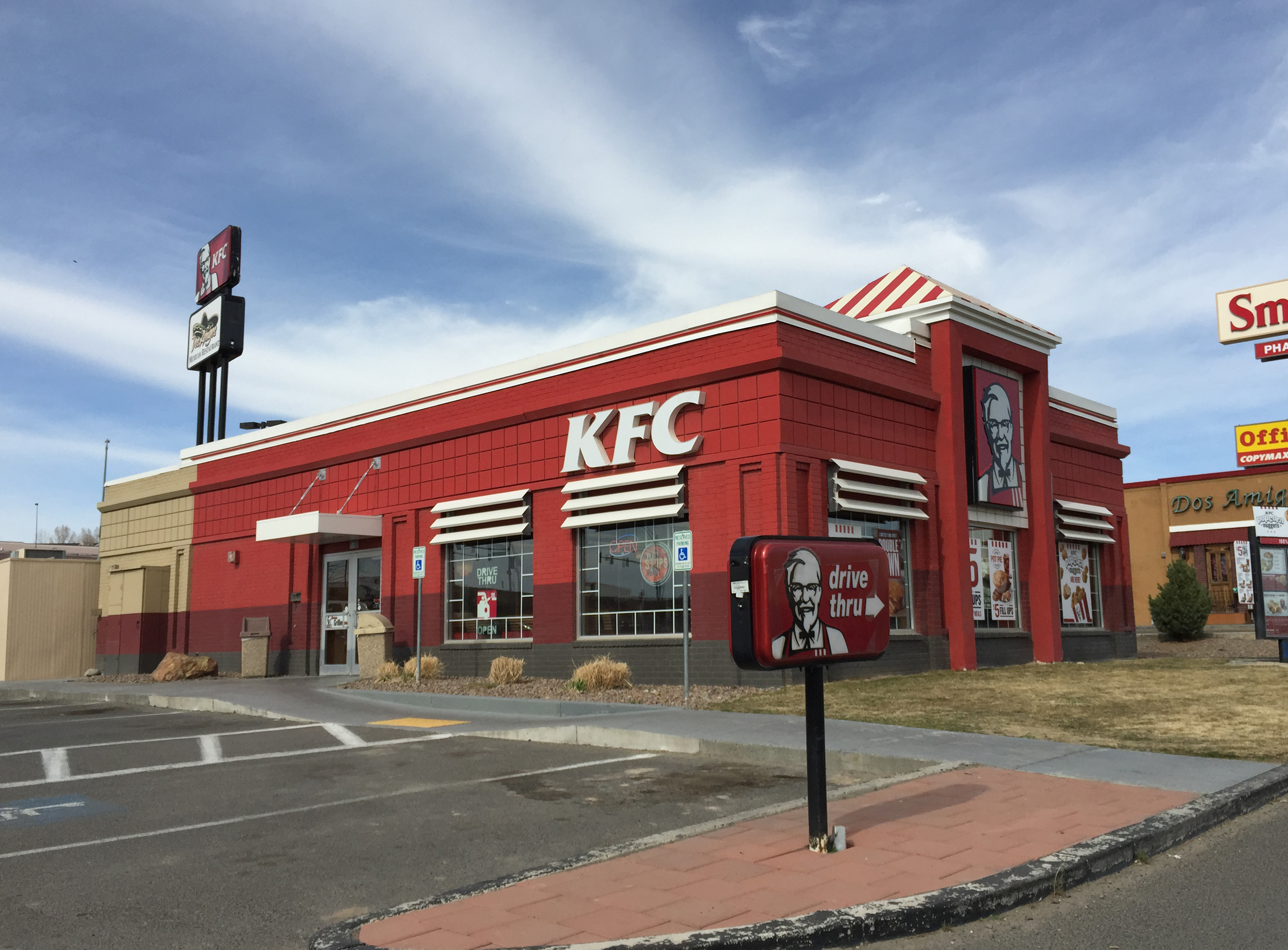
A KFC in Elko, Nevada, United States

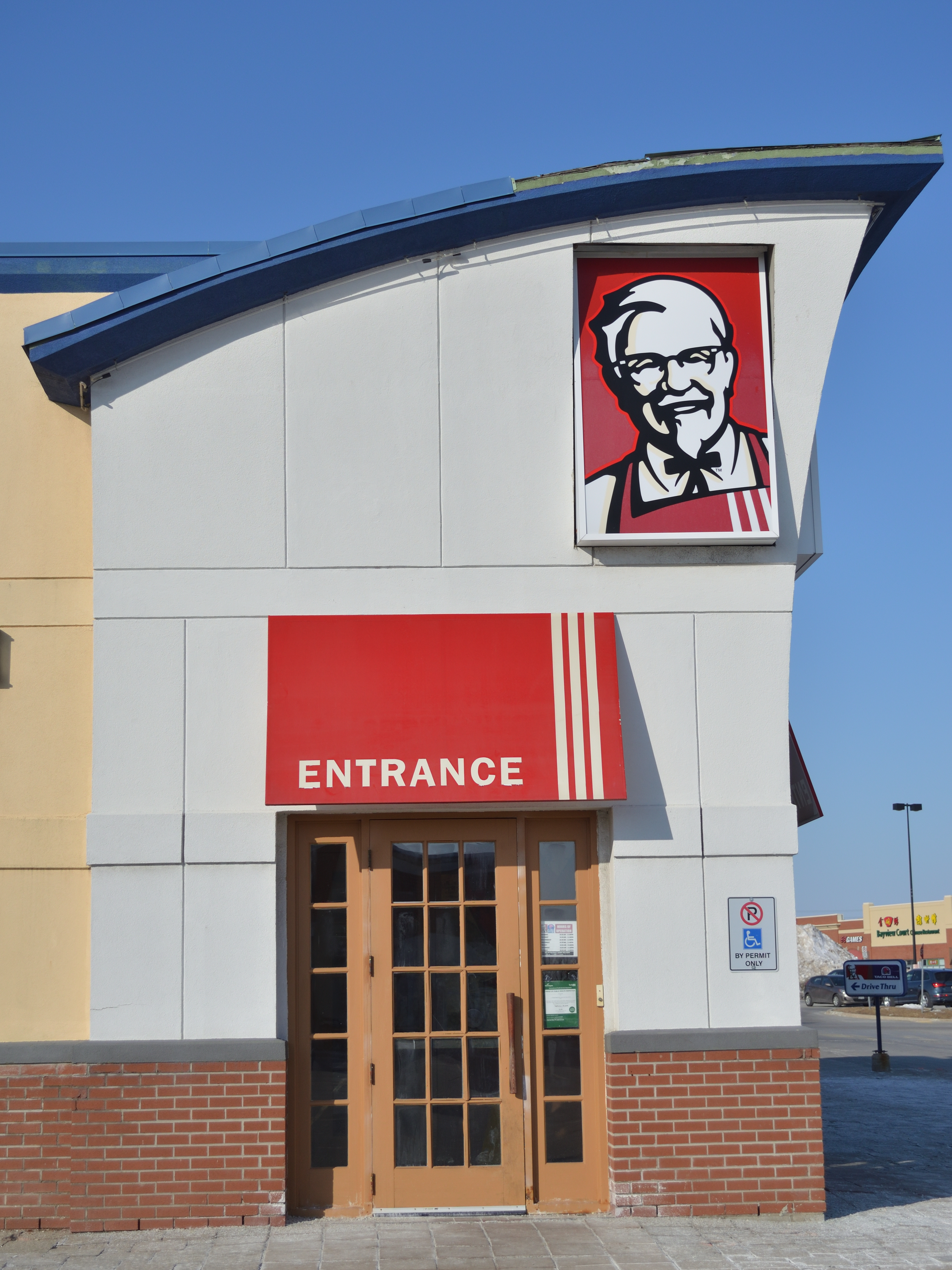
A KFC in Richmond Hill, Ontario, Canada

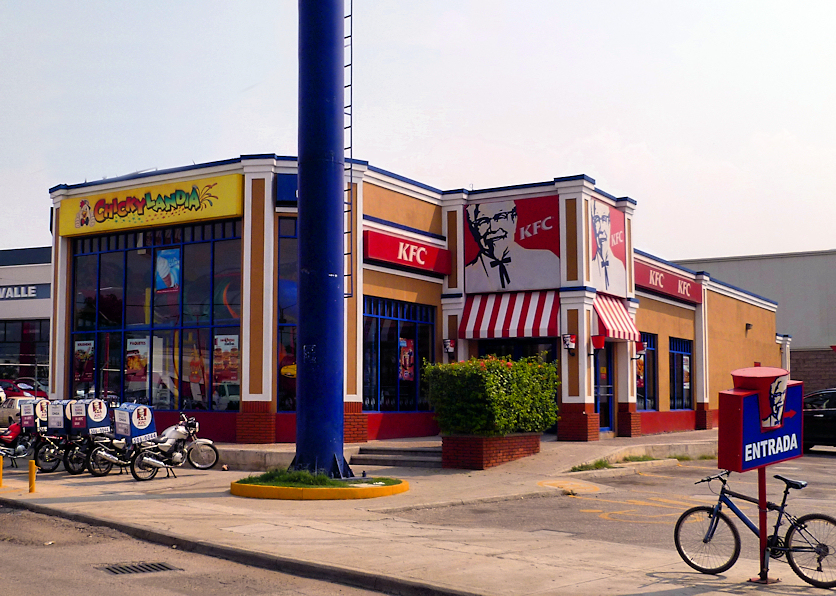
A KFC in Oaxaca, Oaxaca, Mexico

=== Oceania ===
Country/region	Year entered	Outlets	First outlet	Owner/major operator	Notes
Australia	1968	800	Guildford, Sydney	KFC Australia Pty Ltd, Collins Foods	
Guam	1975	8	Tamuning	?	
New Zealand	1971	119	Royal Oak, Auckland	Restaurant Brands	
Northern Mariana Islands	1986	1	Saipan	?	

==== Gallery ====
The following is a gallery of KFC outlets in Oceanian countries.
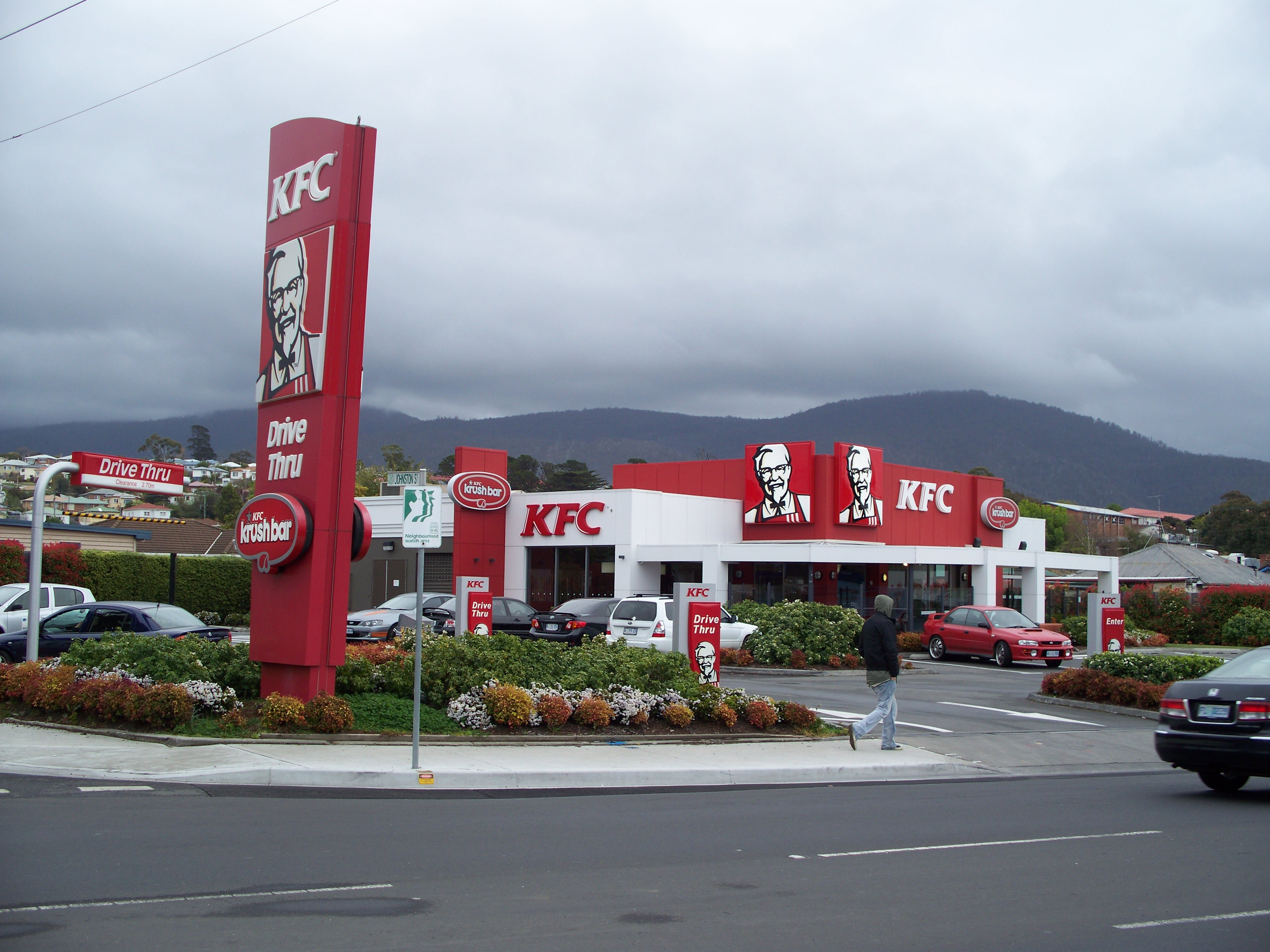
A KFC outlet in Derwent Park, a northern suburb of Hobart, Australia

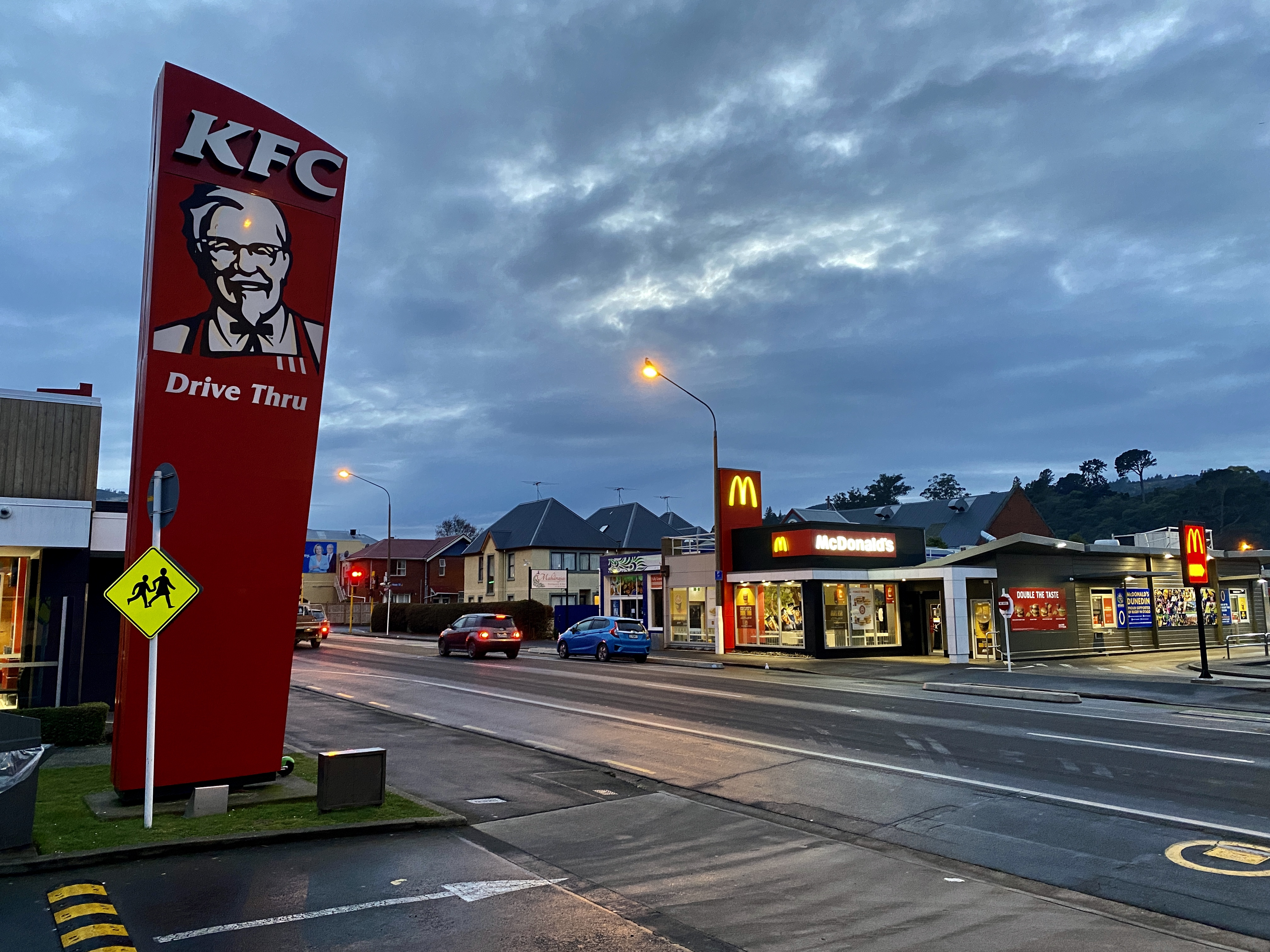
A KFC outlet in Dunedin, New Zealand

== Former markets ==
=== Asia ===
Country/region	Year existed	Outlets	First outlet	Owner/major operator	Notes
Iran	1973–1979	6	Tehran	Reza Raeesi	The franchise was abandoned in Iran following the Iranian revolution in 1979. Colonel Sanders visited Tehran in the 1970s. KFC had stressed that the five outlets that opened in Karaj in 2012 and Mashhad in 2014 with three in Tehran in 2015 under the KFC name are totally unaffiliated franchises under separate management albeit with official-looking signage with other knockoffs operating under marquees such as KF, ZFC, Kabooky Fried Chicken and Kentucky House.
Syria	2006–2013 (Nasser Khurafi)	7	Damascus	Nasser Khurafi (A businessman from Kuwait)	All outlets were shut down in 2013 due to the ongoing Syrian Civil War. Following the end of the Civil War, the KFC outlets in Syria are yet to be opened.

==== Gallery ====
The following is a gallery of former KFC outlets in Asian countries.
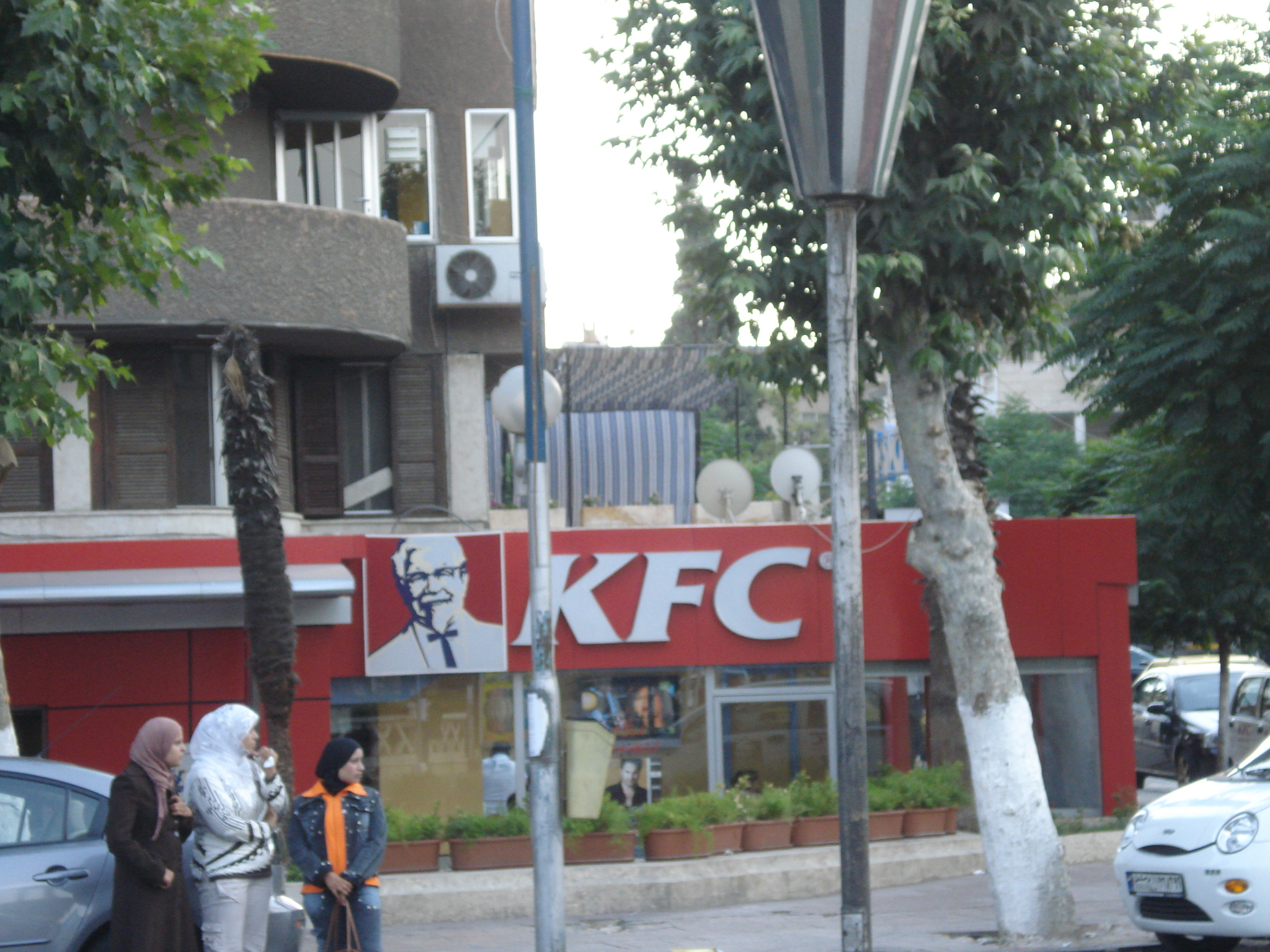
A former KFC restaurant in Damascus, Syria

=== Caribbean and South America ===
Country/region	Year entered	Outlets	First outlet	Owner/major operator	Notes
Belize	mid-1970s–early 1980s	1	Belize City	Mike Holmes family	Closed due to strict international franchise regulations made it impossible to compete with lower local prices. KFC has since attempted to reenter the Belizean market, but with very little to no success at all.
Haiti	1977–1997	1	Port-au-Prince	Guy Riviere	Closed due to the economic crisis and declining sales. KFC has since attempted to reenter the Haitian market, but with very little to no success at all.
Puerto Rico	1967-2026	83	Levittown	Encanto Restaurants, Inc.	Yum! Brands, terminated its franchise agreement with the local operator, Encanto Restaurants, after the operator failed to meet corporate quality and operating standards. Closed all outlets alongside Taco Bell. KFC has since attempted to reenter the Puerto Rican market, but with very little to no success at all.

=== Europe ===
Country/region	Year entered	Owner/major operator	Notes
Andorra	1979–2014		KFC closed its doors in Andorra in 2014. Probably closed due to nearby French and Spanish outlets, which were reducing sales.
Russia	2011–2024	Yum! International	KFC closed and sold its restaurants in Russia along with Pizza Hut in response to the Russian invasion of Ukraine and the Russo-Ukrainian War. Restaurants were rebranded as Rostic's starting in late 2023. Some restaurants continue to use KFC for their logo, but the name isn't official anymore.

==== Gallery ====
The following is a gallery of former KFC outlets in European countries.
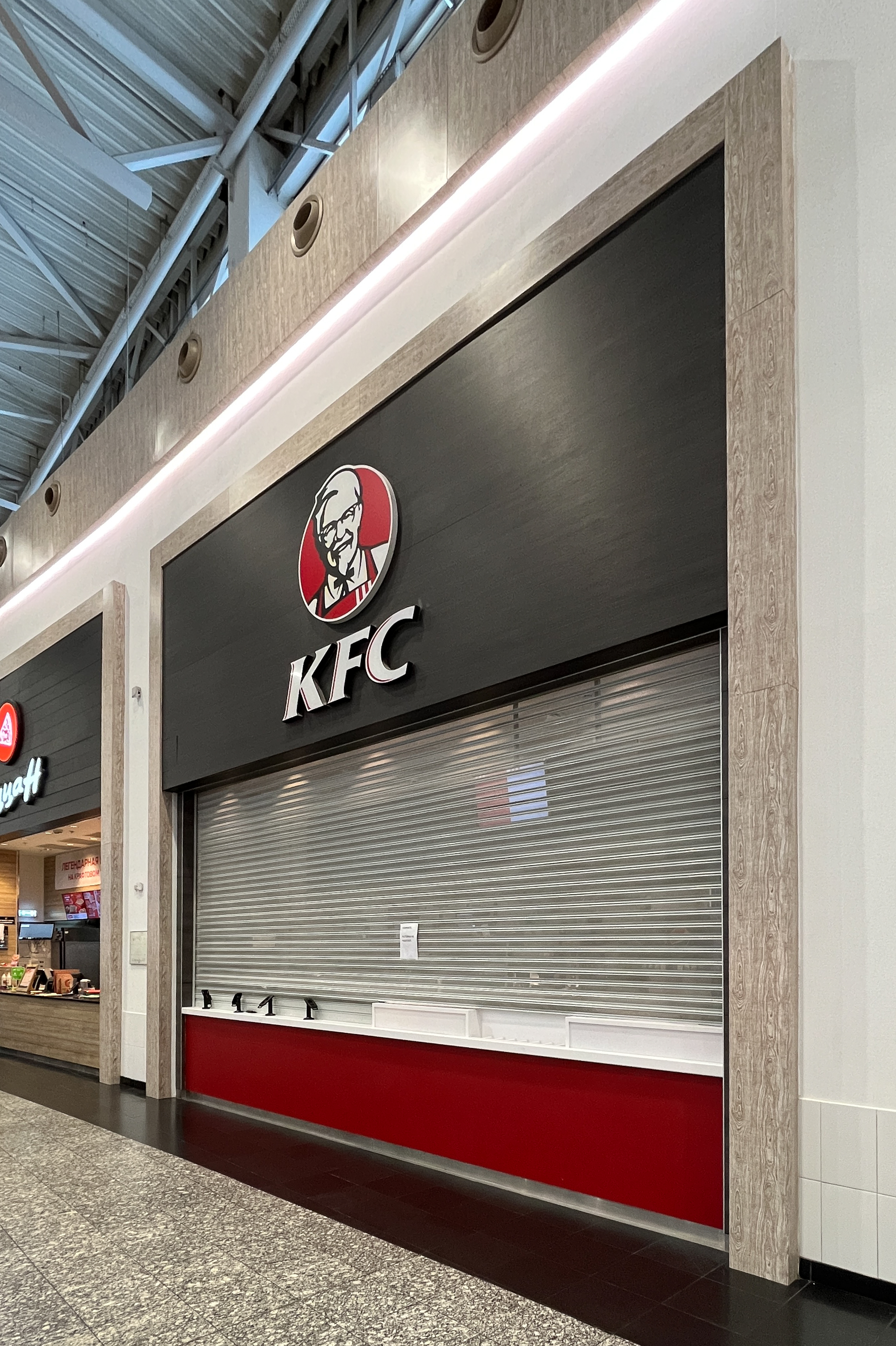
A closed KFC branch in Kotelniki, Russia

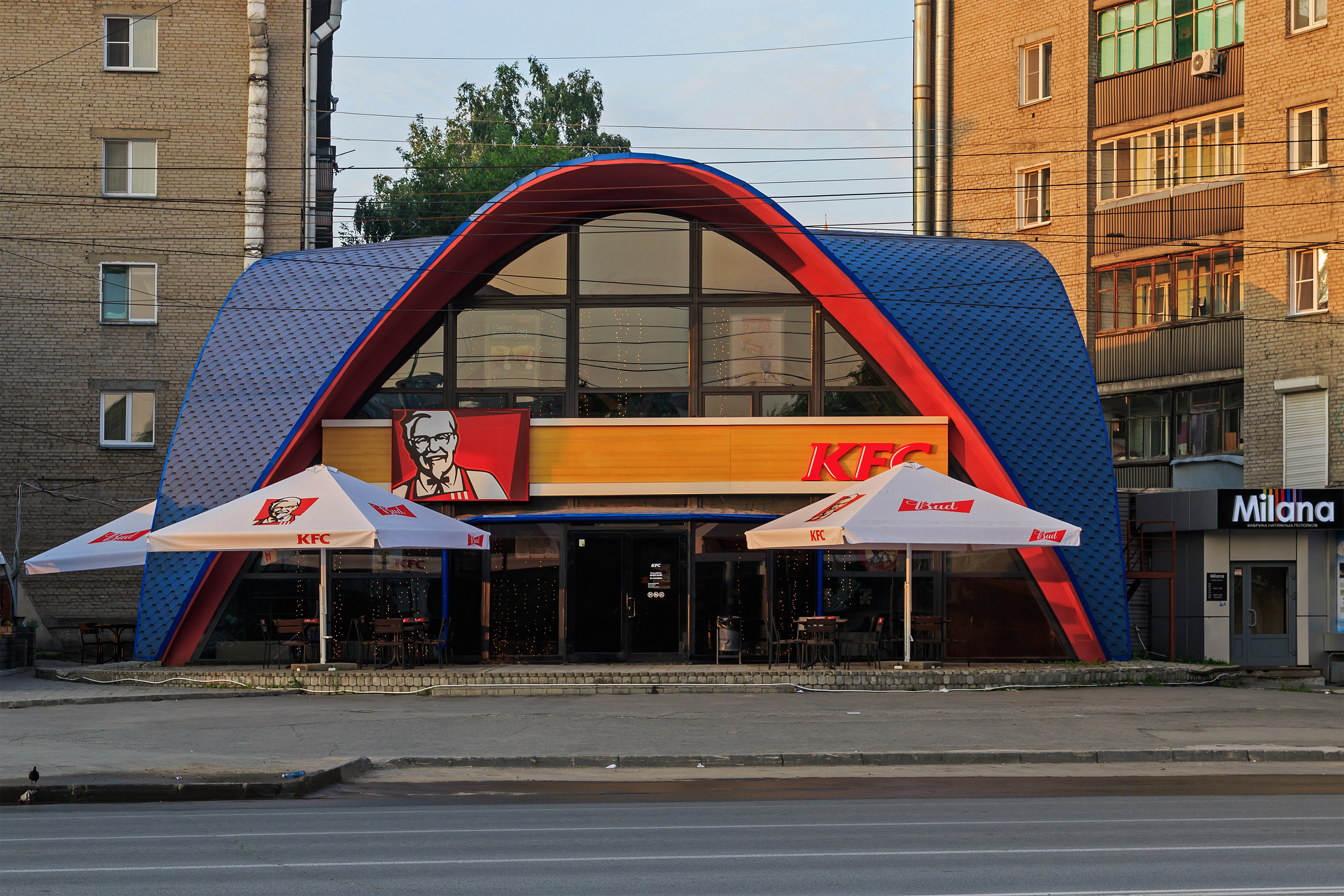
A KFC restaurant at Chelyuskintsev Street in Novosibirsk, Russia

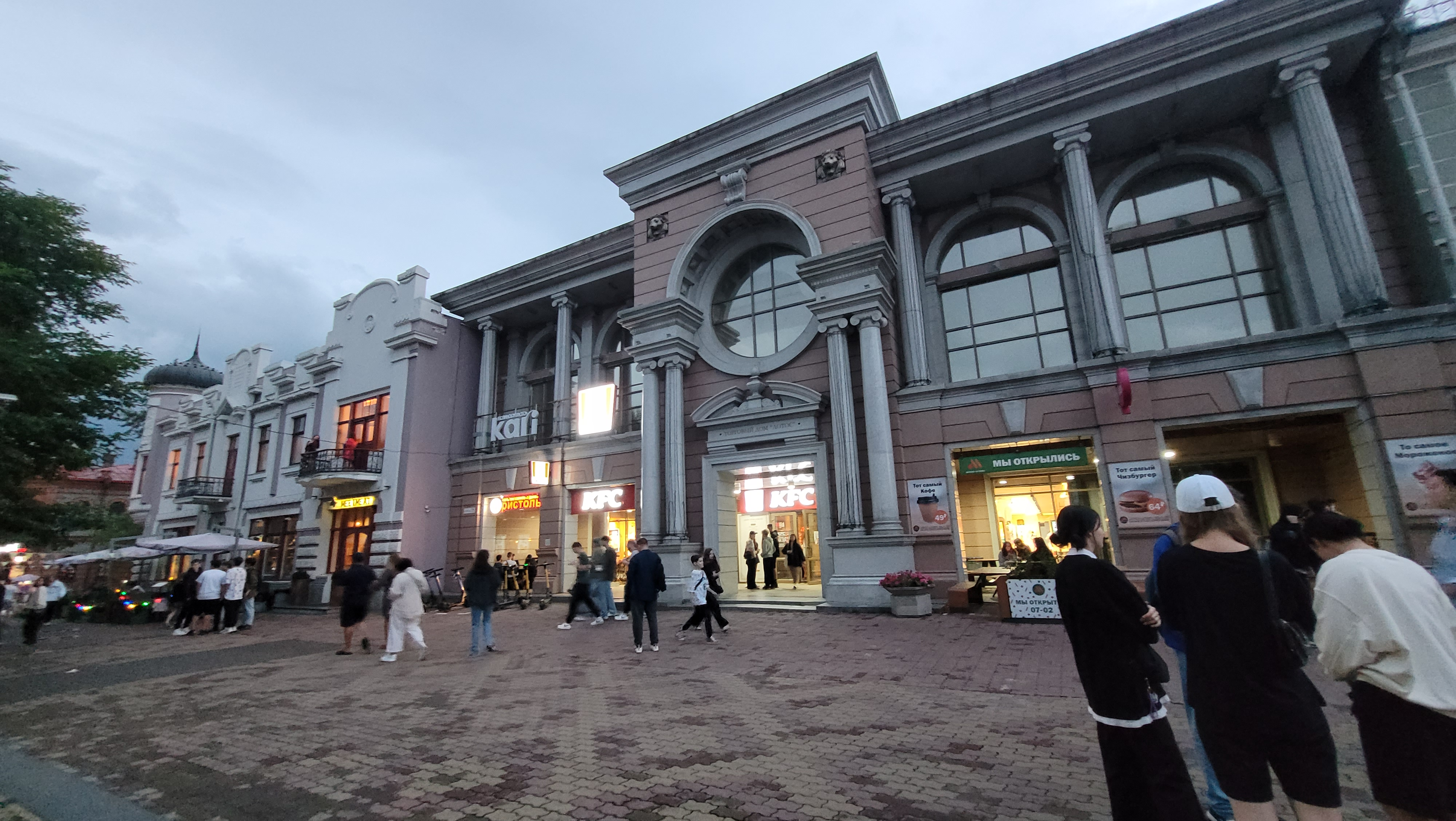
A KFC restaurant in Khabarovsk, Russia

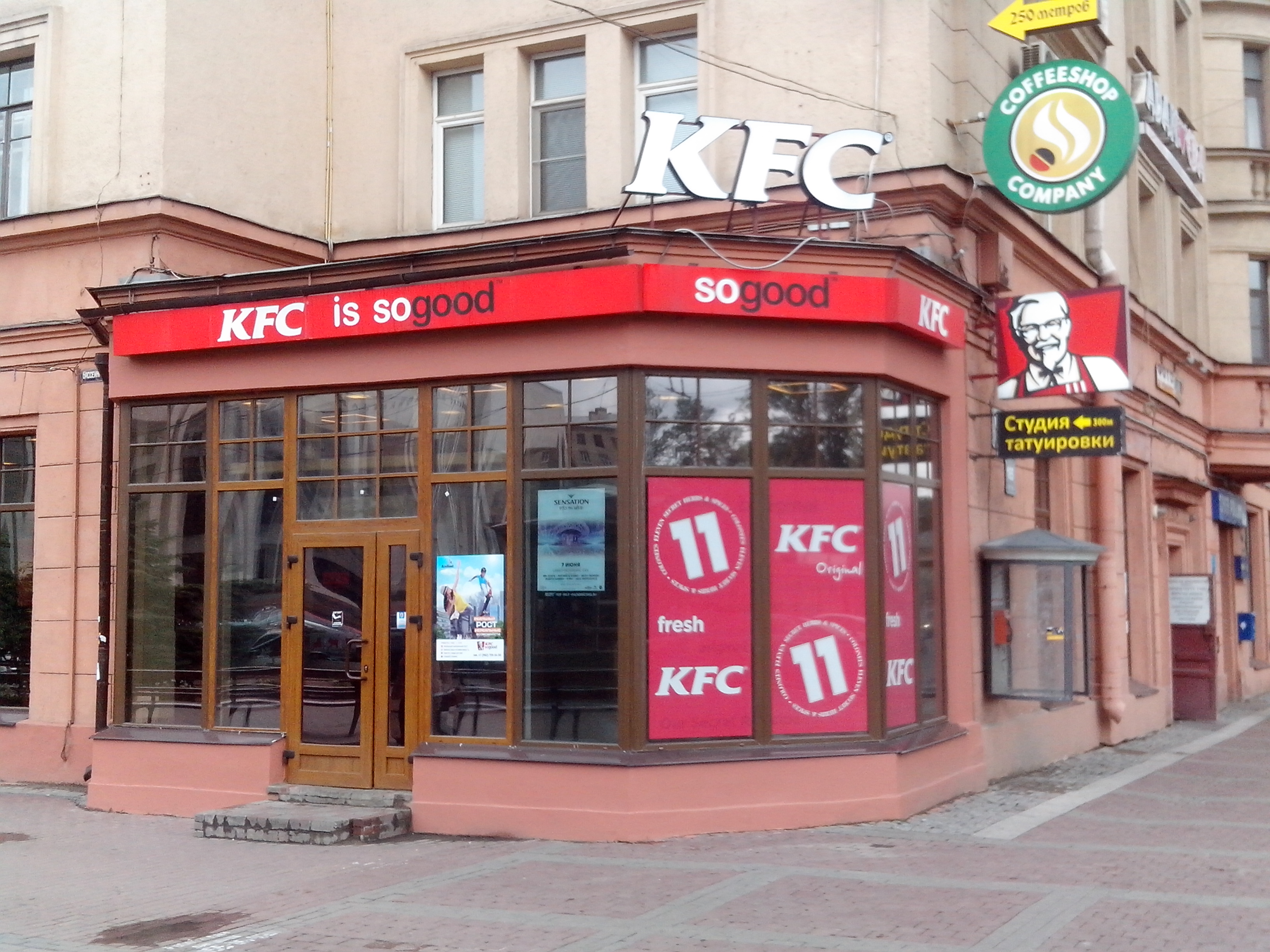
KFC in Saint Petersburg, Russia

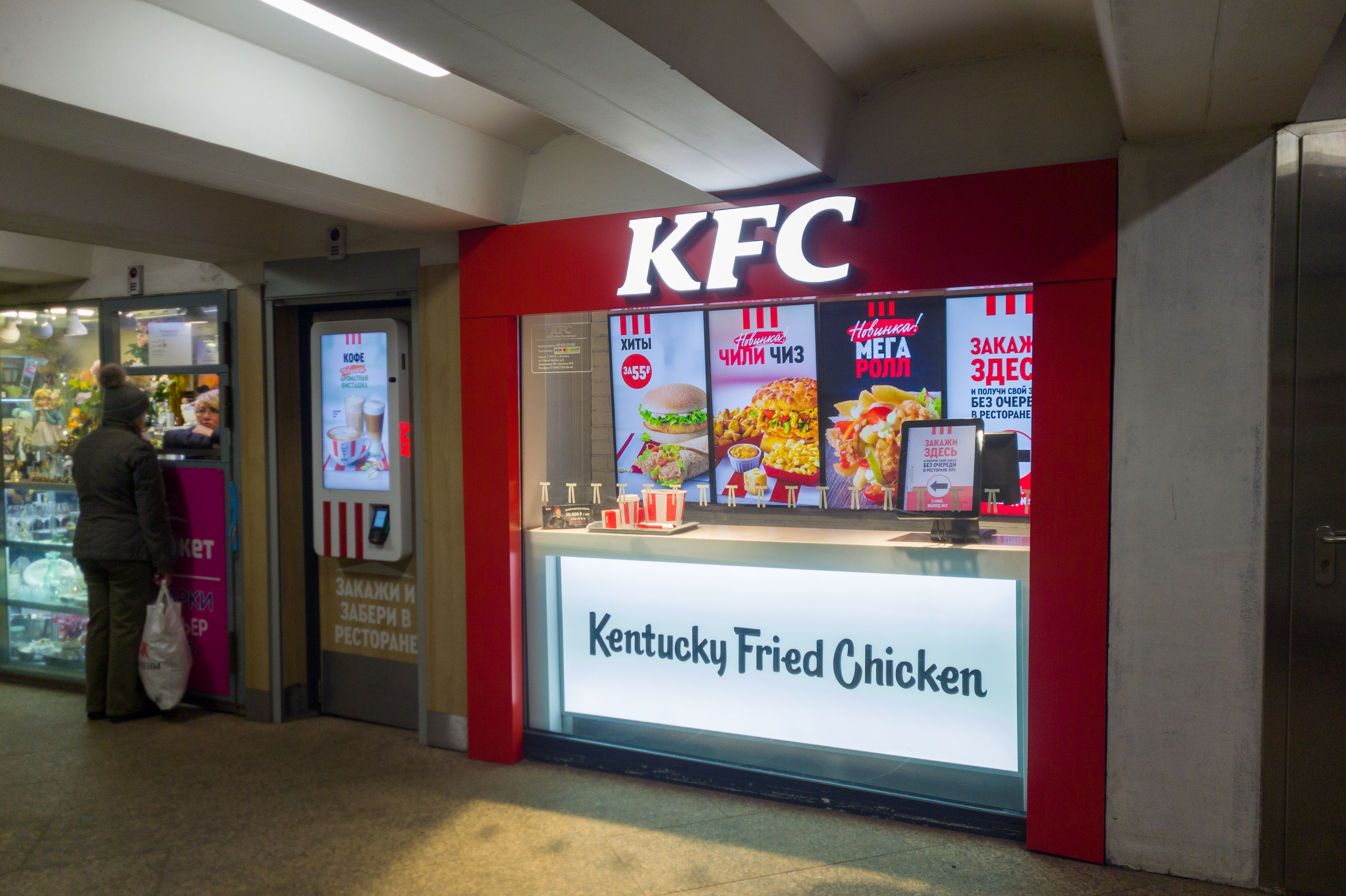
A KFC kiosk in Moscow, Russia. This kiosk remained open after KFC ceased operations in Russia in 2022.

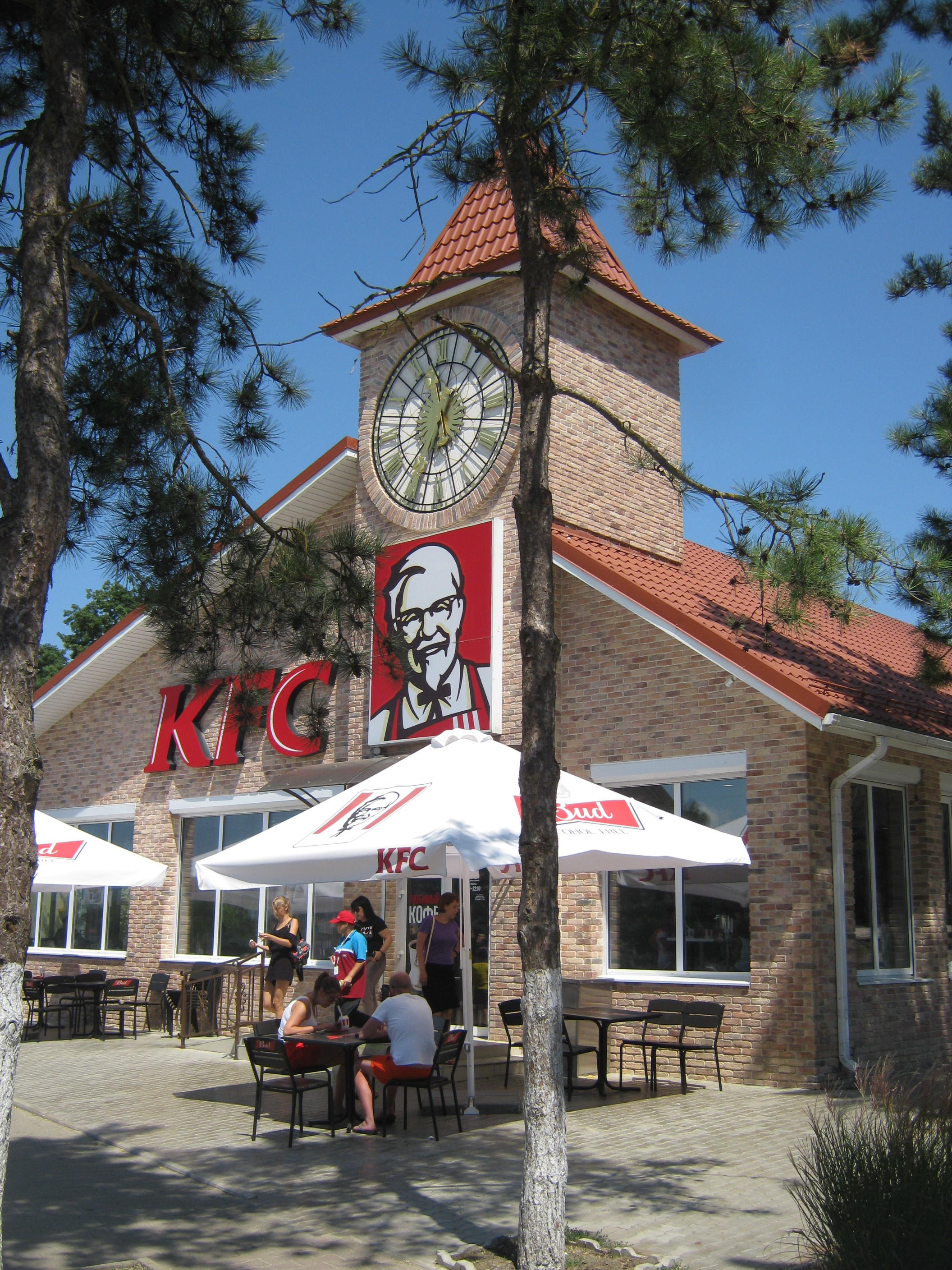
KFC in Temryuk, Russia

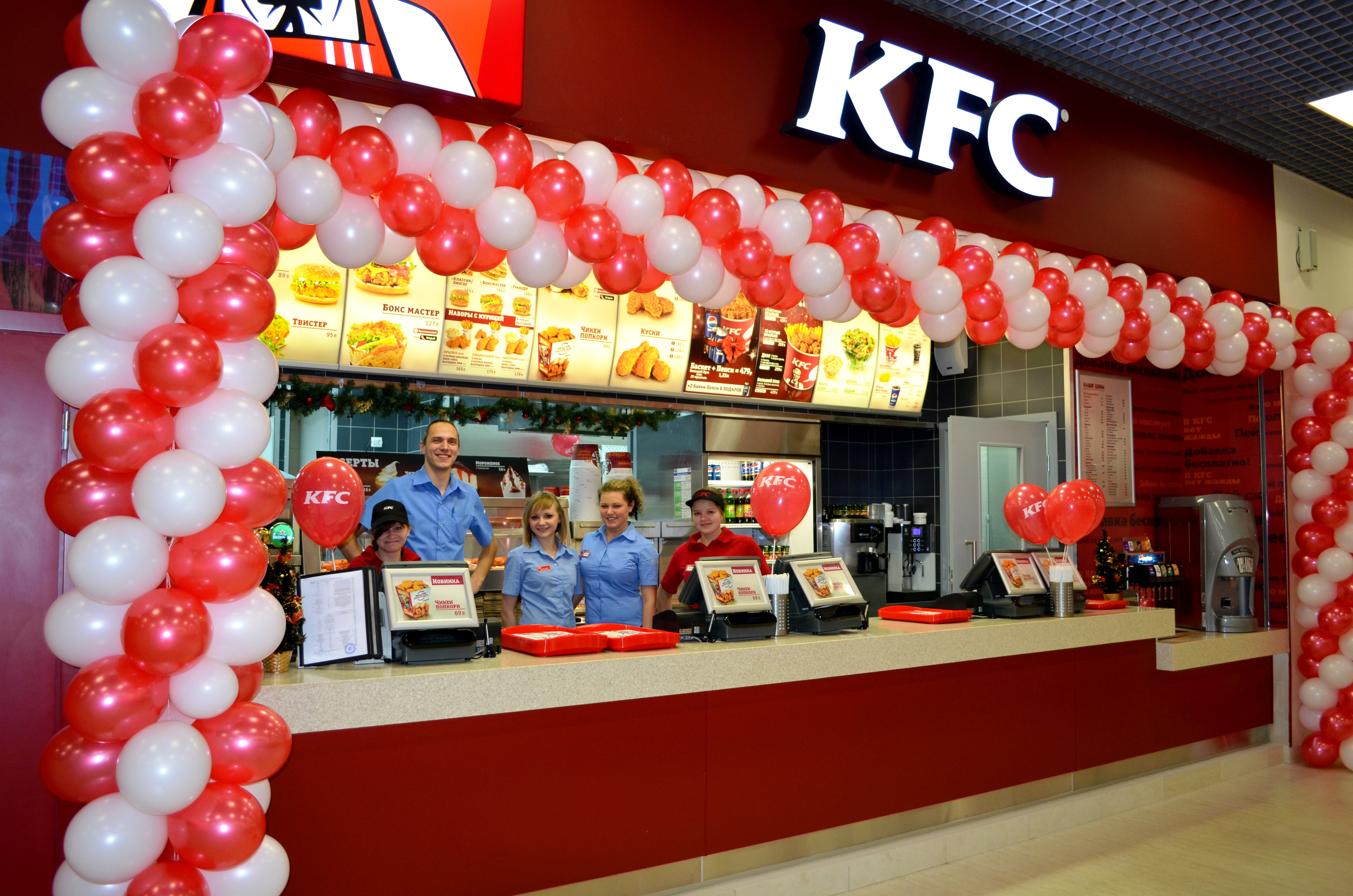
Another KFC in Saint Petersburg, Russia

=== Oceania ===
Country/region	Year existed	Owner/major operator	Notes
American Samoa	1984–2008	?	
Fiji	2001–2011	Kazi Foods	Left in 2011 amid a dispute over imports of the ingredients to make its flavored crumb coating.

== See also ==
- List of countries with McDonald's restaurants
