= NSP =

NSP may refer to:

== Companies and organizations ==
- Afghan National Solidarity Programme, an initiative to develop villages in Afghanistan
- National Ski Patrol, a rescue organization in ski areas in the United States
- National Solidarity Party (Singapore)
- Nature's Sunshine Products, US health supplement manufacturer
- Nebraska State Patrol
- Network of Spiritual Progressives, US political movement
- New Sarum Police, former name for the Salisbury City Police in the 1830s
- Nevada State Prison
- Nordic Service Partners, fast food franchisee
- Northern States Power Company, a division of Xcel Energy
- Nova Scotia Power, Canada
- ICAO code for aircraft flown by Samaritan's Purse
- People's Freedom Movement (Narodni slobodarski pokret), a political party in Serbia

== Technology ==
- Native Signal Processing, Intel's term for host signal processing
- Network security policy, rules for computer network access
- Network service provider, a business that provides access to the Internet
- Nvidia Shield Portable

== Biology ==
- Non-starch polysaccharide, often incorrectly used interchangeably with dietary fiber
- Nonstructural protein of viruses, Viral nonstructural protein, as found e. g. in Rotavirsues (NSP1–NSP6) and Corinaviruses (NSP1–NSP16): NSP1, NSP2, NSP3, NSP4, NSP5, NSP6.
- Nsp is the acronym for the gene encoding a nonstructural protein (in italics: Nsp1, Nsp2...)

== Places ==
- Netaji Subhash Place metro station
- The Niagara Scenic Parkway, a parkway in Niagara Falls, New York
- The Northern State Parkway, a parkway on the North Shore of Long Island, New York

== Other uses ==
- Natural swimming pool, a man-made chemical-free swimming pool
- Needle and syringe programme, another name for Needle exchange programme, a program to reduce disease in drug users
- New Southbound Policy, an initiative of the Government of the Republic of China (Taiwan).
- Ninja Sex Party, an American musical comedy-rock and electronic band
- Nuovo Siluro Pesante, a torpedo used by the Italian Navy
- Nurse scheduling problem
