= Roxan =

Protein-coding gene in the species Homo sapiens

ZC3H7B

Identifiers
- Aliases: ZC3H7B, RoXaN, zinc finger CCCH-type containing 7B, ROXAN1
- External IDs: OMIM: 618206; MGI: 1328310; GeneCards: ZC3H7B

Gene location (Human)
Chr.	Chromosome 22 (human)
Band	22q13.2	Start	41,301,525 bp
Band	22q13.2	End	41,360,147 bp

Gene location (Mouse)
Chr.	Chromosome 15 (mouse)
Band	15|15 E1	Start	81,629,258 bp
Band	15|15 E1	End	81,680,461 bp
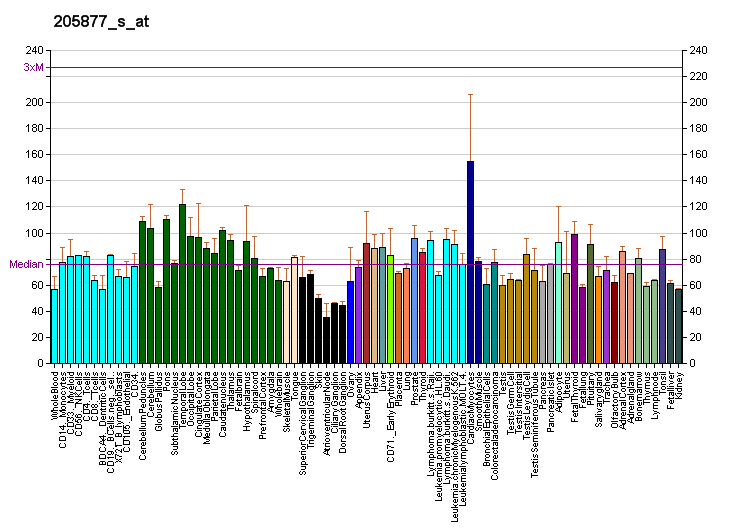

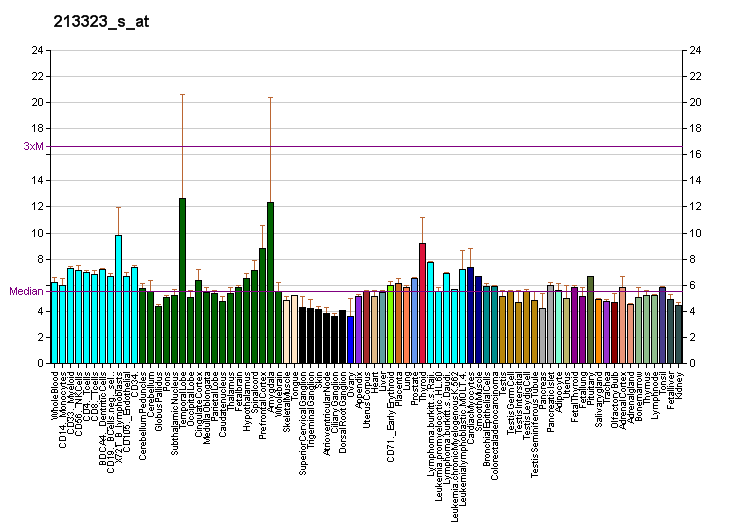
RNA expression pattern
Bgee	Human / Mouse (ortholog); Top expressed in: endothelial cell; buccal mucosa cell; nipple; renal medulla; cardia; pylorus; superior surface of tongue; ventral tegmental area; sperm; trigeminal ganglion / Top expressed in: otolith organ; hand; utricle; dentate gyrus of hippocampal formation granule cell; Gonadal ridge; decidua; visual cortex; ventricular zone; suprachiasmatic nucleus; primary visual cortex; More reference expression data
BioGPS	More reference expression data
Gene ontology
Molecular function	metal ion binding; protein binding; RNA binding; miRNA binding
Cellular component	nucleus
Biological process	viral process; posttranscriptional regulation of gene expression; production of miRNAs involved in gene silencing by miRNA
Sources:Amigo / QuickGO
Orthologs
Databases	NCBI: entry; OMA: entry
Species	Human	Mouse
Entrez	23264	20286
Ensembl	ENSG00000100403	ENSMUSG00000022390
UniProt	Q9UGR2	F8VPP8
RefSeq (mRNA)	NM_017590	NM_001081016
RefSeq (protein)	NP_060060	NP_001074485
Location (UCSC)	Chr 22: 41.3 – 41.36 Mb	Chr 15: 81.63 – 81.68 Mb
PubMed search
- Wikidata
View/Edit Human	View/Edit Mouse

RoXaN (Rotavirus 'X'-associated non-structural protein) also known as ZC3H7B (zinc finger CCCH-type containing 7B), is a protein that in humans is encoded by the ZC3H7B gene. RoXaN is a protein that contains tetratricopeptide repeat and leucine-aspartate repeat as well as zinc finger domains. This protein also interacts with the rotavirus non-structural protein NSP3.

== Function ==
Rotavirus mRNAs are capped but not polyadenylated, and viral proteins are translated by the cellular translation machinery. This is accomplished through the action of the viral Nonstructural Protein NSP3 which specifically binds the 3' consensus sequence of viral mRNAs and interacts with the eukaryotic translation initiation factor eIF4G I.

RoXaN (rotavirus X protein associated with NSP3) is 110-kDa cellular protein that contains a minimum of three regions predicted to be involved in protein–protein or nucleic acid–protein interactions. A tetratricopeptide repeat region, a protein–protein interaction domain most often found in multiprotein complexes, is present in the amino-terminal region. In the carboxy terminus, at least five zinc finger motifs are observed, further suggesting the capacity of RoXaN to bind other proteins or nucleic acids. Between these two regions exists a paxillin leucine-aspartate repeat (LD) motif which is involved in protein–protein interactions.

== Clinical significance ==
RoXaN is capable of interacting with NSP3 in vivo and during rotavirus infection. Domains of interaction correspond to the dimerization domain of NSP3 (amino acids 163 to 237) and the LD domain of RoXaN (amino acids 244 to 341). The interaction between NSP3 and RoXaN does not impair the interaction between NSP3 and eIF4G I, and a ternary complex made of NSP3, RoXaN, and eIF4G I can be detected in rotavirus-infected cells, implicating RoXaN in translation regulation.

Expression of RoXaN was found to be correlated with a higher tumor grad in GIST (gastrointestinal stromal tumors).
