= Albert Kapikian =

Armenian-American virologist

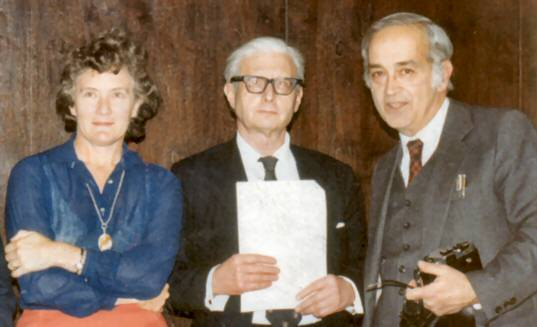
- Ruth Bishop, Tom Flewett and Al Kapikian, in 1980.
- Born: May 9, 1930
- Died: February 24, 2014 (aged 83)
- Education: Cornell University (BS, MD)
- Awards: Sabin Gold Medal (2005)
- Scientific career
- Fields: Virology

Albert Zaven Kapikian (1930–2014) was an Armenian-American virologist who developed the first licensed vaccine against rotavirus, the most common cause of severe diarrhea in infants. He was awarded the Sabin Gold Medal for his pioneering work on the vaccine. He is the 13th recipient of this recognition, awarded annually by the Sabin Vaccine Institute. Called the father of human gastroenteritis virus research, Kapikian identified the first norovirus, initially called Norwalk virus, in 1972; and he and his colleagues at the National Institutes of Health identified the hepatitis A virus in 1973.

== Life ==
Kapikian graduated from Cornell Medical College in 1956 and began a career with the National Institutes of Health in 1957. In 1970 he spent six months in the UK where at the suggestion of his boss he studied the techniques of June Almeida. Almedia took the first photos of coronavirus using novel techniques. Back in the USA he used these techniques to identify non-bacterial gastroenteritis - Norwalk virus.

He was chief of the epidemiology section of the Laboratory of Infectious Diseases at NIH's National Institute of Allergy and Infectious Diseases (NIAID), a position he held for 45 years. In 1998 he was appointed deputy director of the National Institute of Allergy and Infectious Diseases.

Kapikian died on February 24, 2014, at the age of 83.
