= HSP =

HSP may refer to:

== Biology, chemistry, and medicine ==
- Hansen solubility parameters
- Heat shock protein
- Henoch–Schönlein purpura
- Hereditary spastic paraplegia
- Highly sensitive person, with high sensory processing sensitivity (SPS)

== Mathematics, software, and technology ==
- Hidden subgroup problem, in mathematics
- High Speed Photometer, Hubble Space Telescope instrument
- Host signal processing, software emulating hardware
- Hot Soup Processor, a programming language
- High-Scoring Segment Pair, in the BLAST algorithm
- Headset Profile, a Bluetooth profile

== Education ==
- Harvard Sussex Program, an inter-university collaboration
- Holy Spirit Preparatory School, in Atlanta, Georgia, United States

== Political parties ==
- Croatian Party of Rights (Croatian: Hrvatska stranka prava)
- People's Voice Party (Turkish: Halkın Sesi Partisi), Turkey

== Other uses ==
- Halal snack pack, an Australian dish
