= NS34 =

NS34 may refer to:

- NSP3 (rotavirus), a rotavirus protein also known as NS34
- Kings South (constituency N.S. 34), Nova Scotia, Canada; a provincial electoral district
- New Penguin Shakespeare volume 34
- Blue Origin NS-34, a suborbital spaceflight
