= NSP5 (rotavirus) =

Identifiers
- Symbol: Rota_NS26
- Pfam: PF01525
- InterPro: IPR002512
Available protein structures:
- PDB: IPR002512 PF01525 (ECOD; PDBsum)
- AlphaFold: IPR002512; PF01525

NSP5 (nonstructural protein 5) encoded by genome segment 11 of group A rotaviruses. In virus-infected cells NSP5 accumulates in the viroplasms. NSP5 has been shown to be autophosphorylated. Interaction of NSP5 with NSP2 was also demonstrated. In rotavirus-infected cells, the non-structural proteins NSP5 and NSP2 localize in complexes called viroplasms, where replication and assembly occur and they can drive the formation of viroplasm-like structures in the absence of other rotaviral proteins and rotavirus replication.

There is no atomic-resolution structure of NSP5 determined as of June 2019. However, the low resolution three-dimensional structure of the NSP2-NSP5 assembly has been observed by cryo-EM. NSP5 occupies the same site as RNA when binding to NSP2. The EM data from this 2006 study has not been published.
