= NSP6 (rotavirus) =

Identifiers
- Symbol: Rota_NS6
- Pfam: PF04866
- InterPro: IPR006950
Available protein structures:
- Pfam: structures / ECOD
- PDB: RCSB PDB; PDBe; PDBj
- PDBsum: structure summary

Non-structural Protein 6 (NSP6) is one of the two non-structural proteins that gene 11 in rotavirus encodes for alongside NSP5. It is a putative transmembrane domain protein. NSP6 is composed of six transmembrane domains and a C terminal tail. In contrast to the other rotavirus non-structural proteins, NSP6 was found to have a high rate of turnover, being completely degraded within 2 hours of synthesis. NSP6 was found to be a sequence-independent nucleic acid binding protein, with similar affinities for ssRNA and dsRNA

It has been determined that NSP6 has three crucial functions that it conducts. As messages flow among the replication organelle and the endoplasmic reticulum (ER) NSP6 acts as a filter. In this case, NSP6 hinders the access of ER luminal proteins to the DMVs but permits the passing of lipids. Next NSP6 arranges DMV clusters, since the DMV clusters are organized by NSP6 it can reconstruct them with LD-derived Lipids. Lastly, through LD-tethering complex DFCP1-RAB18 intervenes in the contact of lipid droplets (LDs). --> This information is not applicable for Rotavirus NSP6, but for SARS-CoV-2 NSP6!!

Since NSP6 is one of two non-structural proteins that gene 11 codes for NSP6 is found in both α and β coronaviruses and produces autophagosomes. While NSP6 is found to produce a substantial amount of autophagosomes, through the analysis of MAP1LC3B puncta it is observed that autophagosomes produced by NSP6 are much smaller in size. As indicated by the statistical analysis of WIPI2 puncta the size of NSP6-produced autophagosomes is restricted at omegasome formation. The small size of these autophagosomes inhibits the transportation of viral components to lysosomes and this could aid in coronavirus infection.
