= Hsps =

HSPS or HSPs may refer to:

- The plural form of Heat shock protein
- High School for Public Service: Heroes of Tomorrow, a public high school in Brooklyn, New York, U.S.
- The plural form of Highly sensitive person
- Highly Sensitive Person Scale, a measure of HSPs' defining trait, sensory processing sensitivity (SPS)
- Historical Studies in the Physical Sciences (later renamed Historical Studies in the Natural Sciences), a University of California Press academic journal
- Holy Spirit Preparatory School, a preparatory school in Atlanta, Georgia, U.S.
- Human, Social and Political Sciences, an undergraduate course offered by the University of Cambridge

== See also ==
- HSP (disambiguation)
