= MaBoShi: The Three Shape Arcade =

2008 video game

- Developer: Mindware
- Publisher: Nintendo
- Platform: Wii (WiiWare)
- Release: EU: August 29, 2008; JP: October 7, 2008; NA: December 29, 2008
- Genre: Puzzle
- Modes: Single-player, multiplayer

MaBoShi: The Three Shape Arcade (Maboshi's Arcade in North America) is a puzzle video game developed by Mindware and published by Nintendo for the Wii. It was released on the WiiWare service. Its Japanese title is Katachi no Game: Maru Bou Shikaku (カタチのゲーム まるぼうしかく; literally "Game of Shapes: Circle, Bar, Square"). It was released in 2008, in Europe on August 29, in Japan on October 7, and in North America on December 29.

MaBoShi allows players to use their Miis as avatars in the game, as well as send replays to other players via WiiConnect24. In addition, players are also able to download a version of the game for Nintendo DS via DS Download Play.

== Gameplay ==
The game features three minigames, Circle, Bar, and Square, each played differently but with the same objective (scoring one million points) and played on the same screen. Each game can either be played separately or in combination with one or both of the others simultaneously played by other players, with gameplay in one game interacting with and affecting the other games.

=== Circle ===
The player must collide with all enemies as they appear onscreen and before they move off the game area. The player is in control of a constantly spinning circle, and is able to switch the direction it spins with the A button on the Wii Remote. Considered use of the single button allows for fine control of both speed and trajectory, resulting in predictable movement.

Each enemy type takes on their own behavior as they appear in the game area:

- Yellow: slowly walks in a straight line
- Blue: slowly walks in a straight line, halting frequently to change direction
- Pink: slowly walks bending to the right or left
- Green: wanders short distances back and forth, anti-clockwise direction
- Purple: wanders long distances back and forth, anti-clockwise direction

Kuniaki Watanabe designed all levels in the Circle game. Music "Warm Breeze" by Johan Krafft (Logic Bomb).

The original prototype for this game, called Circular, was created by Kuniaki Watanabe in 2003. It used a Flash Lite and a 240x240 screen size so it could be played on the author's Japanese cell phone.

=== Bar ===
The player must maneuver a rotating bar through a level. The bar rotates around a core, which only moves using the momentum created by the bar and only when the A button is held. The bar can be used to defeat enemies and smash blocks, but if the core touches an enemy or a block the game ends.

Music "Bar None" and sound effects by Daisuke Shiiba (Nintendo).

There was no prototype for this game, as it was created during the development of MaBoShi.

=== Square ===
The player controls a block with a trail of fire behind it. The trail of fire can burn obstacles. The screen scrolls when the player moves, and if an obstacle or part of the trail of fire hits the bottom of the screen, the game ends.

Music "Square Zone" by Johan Krafft (Logic Bomb).

An expanded version of this mode was later released as a DSiWare title Flametail (USA), Trailblaze: Puzzle Incinerator (EU), Moyasu Puzzle: Flametail (JPN).

The original prototype for this game, called Mosser, was created by Kuniaki Watanabe for the Hot Soup Processor programming competition: HSP Contest 2004 for which Mindware Corp was a sponsor and judge. Mosser won the Top Prize in the Short Program category.

== Development ==
Mindware Corp's prior work with pinball tables helped influence the design decisions behind MaBoShi, in addition to a desire to create totally new and unique games, and one that is "both innovative and easy to get into". The idea to use only one button for play was made in the beginning of development, but the developer deliberately decided to avoid "swing and play" controls seen in other Wii games such as Wii Sports.

MaBoShi was programmed by Mikito Ichikawa (aka Micky G. Albert), Jun Shimizu and Tadashi Ito (who was also responsible for the DS Download Play version).

Daisuke Shiiba (Nintendo) was responsible for the sound effects in MaBoShi.

In reply to a question about if the game was intended for a casual or hardcore audience, president of Mindware Corp Micky G. Albert responded: "Our target is: Everyone. We always make our games for everyone so that they can understand them and have fun. When you develop a truly new and innovative game, that new and innovative element might hinder players' understanding because it's new! I think "the game had something new and innovative, but players could not understand it" is like a "did not finish" in a race. This is worse than "did finish in last place".

== Reception ==
WiiWare World (now Nintendo Life) scored MaBoShi an 8/10, calling it "a very strange and unique game" and highlighting its simple but fun gameplay, its addictiveness, the bonus downloadable DS version and its "surprisingly excellent" soundtrack. Eurogamer gave it a 9/10, calling the gameplay "deceptively simple, yet incredibly rich" and the multi-tiered system of interacting games "evil genius". IGN called it "wonderfully original and challenging", giving it an 8/10.
