= NSP2 (rotavirus) =

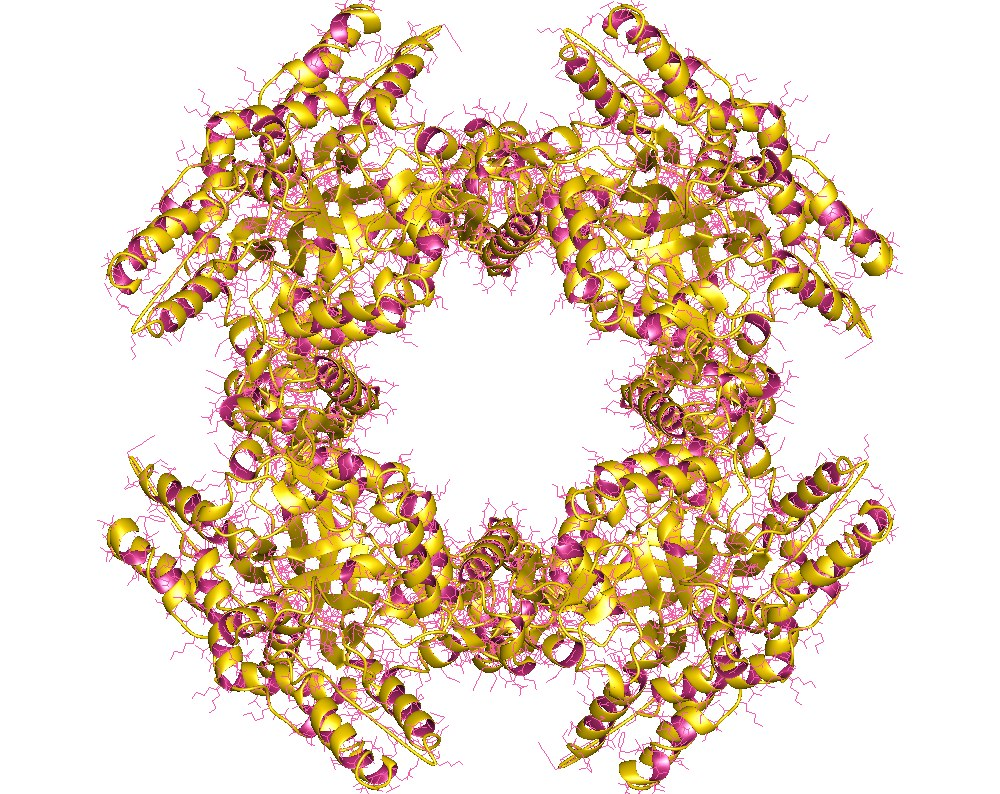
- NSP2 octamer, human rotavirus, PDB: 2gu0.

Identifiers
- Symbol: Rota_NS35
- Pfam: PF02509
- InterPro: IPR003668
- CATH: 2gu0
- SCOP2: 2r7j / SCOPe / SUPFAM
Available protein structures:
- Pfam: structures / ECOD
- PDB: RCSB PDB; PDBe; PDBj
- PDBsum: structure summary
- Protein folds into two domains.

NSP2 (NS35), is one of five to six (depending on the strain) nonstructural proteins expressed by rotaviruses. The octameric NSP2 performs several key functions in the assembly of rotavirus particles. This nonstructural RNA-binding protein accumulates in cytoplasmic inclusions (viroplasms) and is required for genome replication. NSP2 is closely associated in vivo with the viral replicase. The non-structural protein NSP5 plays a role in the structure of viroplasms mediated by its interaction with NSP2.

NSP2 performs several functions including its involvement in viroplasm nucleation, viral RNA replication and packaging, and hijacking the host cell's motor protein machinery. Studies have shown that NSP2 is present in the pre-core rotavirus replication assembly intermediates (RIs) and core RIs which further indicates the importance of NSP2 in the early steps of double layered particle (DLP) formation. This includes +ssRNA assortment and packaging.

== Structure ==
Each one of the eight monomers which make up NSP2 contains a N-terminal domain (residues ~1-140) and a C-terminal domain (residues ~156–313) which are connected by a short loop (residues ~141–155). NSP2 is an octameric ring with a central cavity. This octameric protein forms through the stacking of the same sides of two tetrameric rings. Across this tetramer-tetramer interface there are four basic grooves which run diagonally. These basic grooves in the octamer could act as RNA binding sites.

=== N-terminal domain ===
The N-terminal domain contains two sub-domains connected by a basic loop. The first sub-domain contains two pairs of β-strands with two α-helices in between them. The second sub-domain contains four α-helices.

Studies have shown that a region of this domain containing two α-helices connected by a loop has a similar structure between rotavirus species. This region could be conserved due to its role in the formation of NSP2 tetramer formation and protein oligomerization.

=== C-terminal domain ===
The C-terminal domain contains an anti-parallel β-sheet which is followed by α-helices. At the end of the C-terminal domain is the extreme C-terminal region (CTR; residues ~291–313) which contains a flexible linker region and a terminal α-helix. This region of the C-terminal domain is characterized by its flexibility which allows it to take an "open" or "closed" conformation. An open conformation allows for domain-swapping interactions. This is important for linking together octamers allowing for viroplasm formation. A closed conformation prevents domain-swapping interactions.

CTR is also vital in the RNA chaperone activity of NSP2. While CTR does not directly interact with the RNA, it promotes the release of RNA from NSP2 via a conserved acidic patch on CTR. The acidic patch promotes RNA dissociation through charge repulsion. Along with the repulsion from the negative charge of the acidic patch, there is also an additional negative charge from phosphorylation. The negative charge of the acidic patch as well as the phosphate gives NSP2 its RNA-unwinding and RNA-annealing properties.

== Functions ==
=== Viroplasm formation ===
Viroplasms are inclusions formed in the host's cytosol where the initial steps of rotavirus particle assembly occurs. Associations between NSP2 and NSP5 allow for the formation of these structures. If either NSP2 or NSP5 expression is inhibited in rotavirus infected cells, viroplasms will fail to form. If both of these proteins are expressed on an uninfected cell, viroplasm-like structures (VLS) will still form. VLS are morphologically similar to viroplasms but lack the ability to produce virions.

Two forms of NSP2 are found in rotavirus-infected cells: a diffuse form of NSP2 found in the cytosol (dNSP2) and a form found mainly in the viroplasms (vNSP2). The dNSP2 associates primarily with hypo-phosphorylated NSP5 while vNSP2 associates primarily with hyper-phosphorylated NSP5. One hypothesis suggests that phosphorylation of serine 313 on dNSP2 converts it to vNSP2. Cellular casein kinase 1 (CK1α) is involved in the phosphorylation of NSP2 during this process. The phosphorylation cascade involving phosphorylated NSP2 and hyperphosphorylated NSP5 is necessary for viroplasm formation.

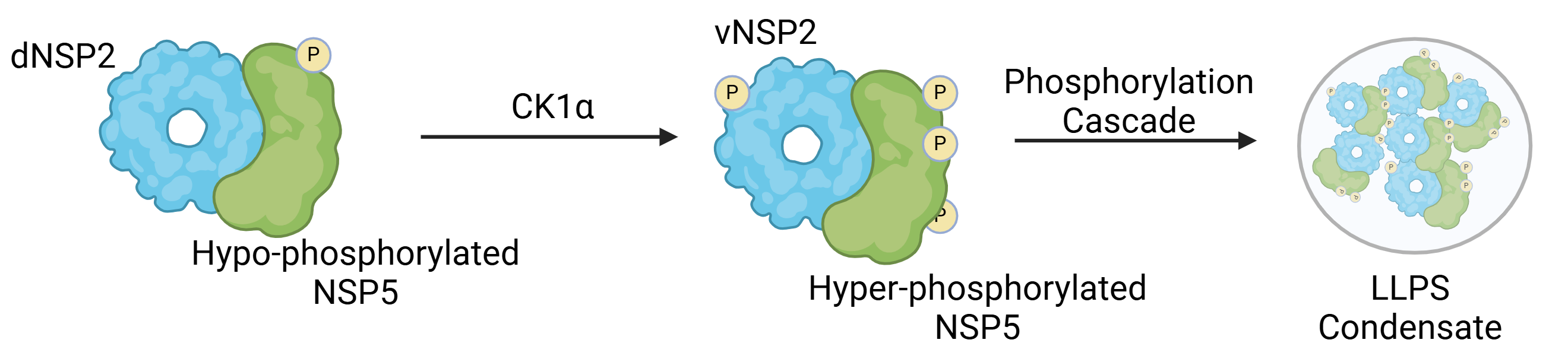
Process by which NSP2 phosphorylation leads to the hyper-phosphorylation of NSP5. This eventually leads to the formation of viroplasms.

One model proposes that viroplasm formation occurs through liquid-liquid phase separation (LLPS). This model proposes that associated NSP2 and NSP5 spontaneously will form droplets with the properties of LLPS condensates. These viroplasms fuse with one another over the course of the infection causing them to increase in size. Evidence of this model includes the dissolution of viroplasms in aliphatic diols. As the viroplasms fuse and grow larger, they become more resistant to aliphatic diols. This reflects the changes in the intermolecular interactions that occur between NSP2 and NSP5 as the viroplasms mature over the course of the infection.

=== RNA binding ===
Rotaviruses contain 11 segmented, double-stranded RNA particles. NSP2 acts as a RNA chaperone to allow all 11 distinct +ssRNA molecules to interact with one another. NSP2 mediates the formation of inter-segment RNA-RNA complexes by binding to the RNA segments. This function requires the flexible CTR of NSP2. It also mediates the formation of these complexes by relaxing the intramolecular RNA structure and globally increasing the RNA backbone flexibility. Through this process NSP2 is able to assort the viral genome.

NSP2 also directly interacts with proteins involved in viral replication (VP1). It is also suggested that NSP2 could possibly maintain pools of nucleotides in the viroplasms to assist in genome replication. These activities are essential for the viral replication of rotaviruses.

=== Hijacking microtubule network ===
Rotaviruses use the preexisting microtubule network in the host cell to allow for the movement and fusion of viroplasms within the cell. Microtubule-based dynein transport is vital for this viroplasm formation in the middle and late stages of infection. NSP2 directly interacts with the dynein intermediate chain (DIC). Specifically, NSP2 interacts with the WD40 repeat domain of DIC. Through this interaction, NSP2 is able to recruit dynein to anchor to and transport viroplasms. Overall, this is able to improve the reproduction of virions over the course of the rotavirus infection.

== Antiviral compounds ==
Dynapyrazole-A has been shown to effectively inhibit the formation of viroplasms in infected cells. Dynapyrazole-A works by targeting and binding to the central cavity of the WD40 repeat domain of the DIC which is important in directing the protein-protein interactions. This prevents NSP2 from binding to the DIC. Since NSP2 is now unable to recruit dynein as effectively, viroplasm formation is inhibited. It has been suggested that this agent could be used in future rotavirus treatments.

Thiazolides such as nitazoxanide and tizoxanide have also been suggested as potential rotavirus treatments. These agents work by disturbing the interactions between NSP2 and NSP5. This hampers viroplasm formation and stability which decreases the overall viral yields. This makes it a potentially effective future treatment for rotavirus infections.
