= NSP1 (rotavirus) =

Viral nonstructural protein

Identifiers
- Symbol: Rota_NS53
- Pfam: PF00981
- InterPro: IPR002148
Available protein structures:
- Pfam: structures / ECOD
- PDB: RCSB PDB; PDBe; PDBj
- PDBsum: structure summary
- PDB: 5jeo:B

NSP1 (NS53), the product of rotavirus gene 5, is a nonstructural RNA-binding protein that contains a cysteine-rich region and is a component of early replication intermediates. RNA-folding predictions suggest that this region of the NSP1 mRNA can interact with itself, producing a stem-loop structure similar to that found near the 5'-terminus of the NSP1 mRNA.

The carboxyl-half of the rotavirus nonstructural protein NSP1 is not required for virus replication.

NSP1 could play a role in host range restriction.

The cysteine-rich region of NSP1 is not considered essential for genome segment reassortment with heterologous virus.

NSP1 interacts with IRF3 in the infected cell. NSP1 is an antagonist of the IFN-signaling pathway.

Interferon regulatory factor 3 (IRF3) is a key transcription factor involved in the induction of interferon (IFN) in response to viral infection. NSP1 binds to and targets IRF3 for proteasome degradation early post-infection. IRF3 degradation is dependent on the presence of NSP1 and the integrity of the N-terminal zinc-binding domain, coupled with the regulated stability of IRF3 and NSP1 by the proteasome, collectively support the hypothesis that NSP1 is an E3 ubiquitin ligase.

NSP1 could mediates the degradation of IRF3, IRF5, and IRF7 by recognizing a common element of IRF proteins, thereby allowing NSP1 to act as a broad-spectrum antagonist of IRF function.

NSP1 also inhibits activation of NFkappaB

NSP1 inhibits cellular apoptosis by directly interacting p85 subunit of PI3K and thus activating PI3K/Akt survival pathway during early stages of rotavirus infection.
