= Bunyaviridae nonstructural S proteins =

Bunyaviridae nonstructural S proteins (NSs) are synthesized by viral DNA/RNA and do not play a role in the replication or the viral protein coating. The nonstructural S segment (NSs) created by Bunyaviridae virus family, are able to interact with the human immune system, in order to increase their replication in infected cells. Understanding this mechanism can have global health impacts.

== Inhibition pathways ==
Within the Bunyaviridae virus family, specifically phlebovirus genus, there has been multiple pathways of the inhibition of the immune response. NSs proteins are able to interact with interferon (INF) pathways, but the mechanism varies from virus to virus. The NSs protein in different viruses have been shown to differ in amino acid sequence by up to 85%.

=== Rift Valley Fever Virus (RVFV) ===
NSs protein is distributed throughout the cytoplasm and nucleus of the RVFV-infected cell. The protein created fiber-like substances within the nucleus. NSs in RVFV to the SAP30 region of DNA in the nucleus of the cell, which is an important promotor region of INF-b. Many other NSs proteins in the Bunyaviridae virus family do not function in this same way.

=== Severe Fever with Thrombocytopenia Syndrome Virus (SFTSV) ===
Although the exact target of the SFTSV is unknown, many believe that the virus attacks human hemopoietic cells. It has been shown that upstream molecules of INFs are unchanged in infected cells, such as MAVS, TRAF6 and TRAF3. This suggests that INFs are still being produced, but they have no effect and are undetectable in people's blood serum. The NSs protein in SFTSV has been shown to interfere with TBK1 which is needed in the activation of both IRF and NF-κB pathways.

=== Uukuniemi virus (UUKV) ===
UUKV is a non-human pathogen that still creates a NSs protein. The NSs protein has only been shown to weakly interact with the 40s subunit of ribosomes and MAVS.

=== Arumowot virus (AMTV) ===
AMTV is another non-human pathogen and its NSs protein is quickly degraded by proteasomes, and therefore doesn't cause infection in humans.
