= NSP3 (rotavirus) =

Identifiers
- Symbol: Rota_NSP3
- Pfam: PF01665
- InterPro: IPR002873
- CATH: 1lj2A00
- SCOP2: d1lj2a_ / SCOPe / SUPFAM
Available protein structures:
- Pfam: structures / ECOD
- PDB: RCSB PDB; PDBe; PDBj
- PDBsum: structure summary

Cellular vs Rotavirus Translation

Rotavirus protein NSP3 (NS34) is bound to the 3' end consensus sequence of viral mRNAs in infected cells.

Four nucleotides are the minimal requirement for RNA recognition by rotavirus nonstructural protein NSP3: using short oligoribonucleotides, it was established that the minimal RNA sequence required for binding of NSP3A is GACC.

Rotavirus RNA-binding protein NSP3 interacts with eIF4GI and evicts the poly(A)-binding protein from eIF4F. And NSP3A, by taking the place of PABP on eIF4GI, is responsible for the shut-off of cellular protein synthesis.

Expression of NSP3 in mammalian cells allows the efficient translation of virus-like mRNA: NSP3 forms a link between viral mRNA and the cellular translation machinery and hence is a functional analogue of cellular poly(A)-binding protein.

Site-directed mutagenesis and isothermal titration calorimetry documented that NSP3 and PABP use analogous eIF4G recognition strategies, despite marked differences in tertiary structure.

Using the yeast two-hybrid assay, RoXan a novel cellular protein was found to bind NSP3. The interaction between NSP3 and RoXaN does not impair the interaction between NSP3 and eIF4GI, and a ternary complex made of NSP3, RoXaN, and eIF4G I can be detected in rotavirus-infected cells, implicating RoXaN in translation regulation.
