= Enterotoxin =

Toxin from a microorganism affecting the intestines

Staph/Strep enterotoxin, C terminal
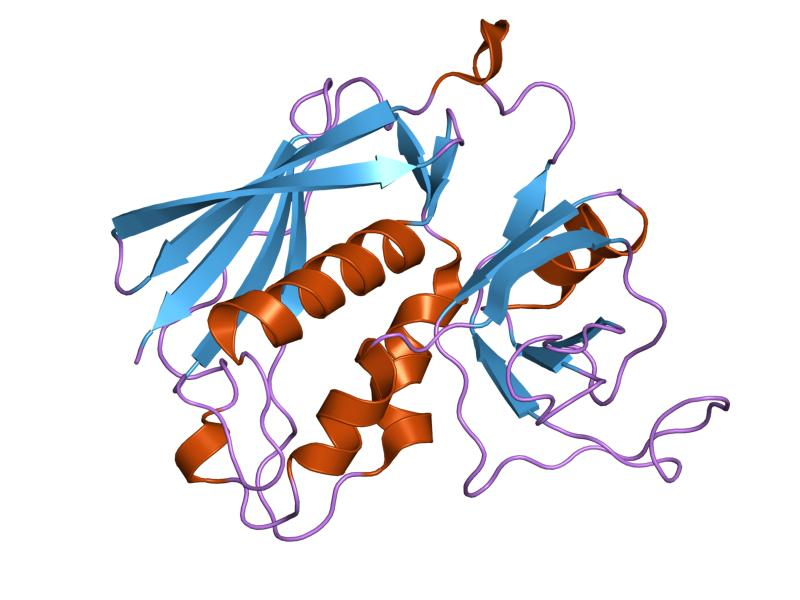
- identification of a secondary zinc-binding site in staphylococcal enterotoxin c2: implications for superantigen recognition

Identifiers
- Symbol: Stap_Strp_tox_C
- Pfam: PF02876
- Pfam clan: CL0386
- InterPro: IPR006123
- PROSITE: PDOC00250
- SCOP2: 1se3 / SCOPe / SUPFAM
- OPM superfamily: 364
- OPM protein: 1dyq
Available protein structures:
- PDB: IPR006123 PF02876 (ECOD; PDBsum)
- AlphaFold: IPR006123; PF02876

An enterotoxin is a protein exotoxin released by a microorganism that targets the intestines. They can be chromosomally or plasmid encoded. They are heat labile (> 60 °C), of low molecular weight and water-soluble. Enterotoxins are frequently cytotoxic and kill cells by altering the apical membrane permeability of the mucosal (epithelial) cells of the intestinal wall. They are mostly pore-forming toxins (mostly chloride pores), secreted by bacteria, that assemble to form pores in cell membranes. This causes the cells to die.

== Clinical significance ==
Enterotoxins have a particularly marked effect upon the gastrointestinal tract, causing traveler's diarrhea and food poisoning. The action of enterotoxins leads to increased chloride ion permeability of the apical membrane of intestinal mucosal cells. These membrane pores are activated either by increased cAMP or by increased calcium ion concentration intracellularly. The pore formation has a direct effect on the osmolarity of the luminal contents of the intestines. Increased chloride permeability leads to leakage into the lumen followed by sodium and water movement. This leads to a secretory diarrhea within a few hours of ingesting enterotoxin. Several microbial organisms contain the necessary enterotoxin to create such an effect, such as Staphylococcus aureus and E. coli.

The drug linaclotide, used to treat some forms of constipation, is based on the mechanism of enterotoxins.

== Classification and 3D structures ==
=== Bacterial ===
Enterotoxins can be formed by the bacterial pathogens Staphylococcus aureus and Bacillus cereus and can cause Staphylococcal Food Poisoning and Bacillus cereus diarrheal disease, respectively. They can also be formed by Shigella pathogens. Staphylococcal enterotoxins and streptococcal exotoxins constitute a family of biologically and structurally related pyrogenic superantigens. 25 staphylococcal enterotoxins (SEs), mainly produced by Staphylococcus aureus, have been identified to date and named alphabetically (SEA – SEZ). It has been suggested that staphylococci other than S. aureus can contribute to Staphylococcal Food Poisoning by forming enterotoxins. Streptococcal exotoxins are produced by Streptococcus pyogenes. These toxins share the ability to bind to the major histocompatibility complex proteins of their hosts. A more distant relative of the family is the S. aureus toxic shock syndrome toxin, which shares only a low level of sequence similarity with this group.

All of these toxins share a similar two-domain fold (N and C-terminal domains) with a long alpha-helix in the middle of the molecule, a characteristic beta-barrel known as the "oligosaccharide/oligonucleotide fold" at the N-terminal domain and a beta-grasp motif at the C-terminal domain. An example is staphylococcal enterotoxin B. Each superantigen possesses slightly different binding mode(s) when it interacts with MHC class II molecules or the T-cell receptor.

The beta-grasp domain has some structural similarities to the beta-grasp motif present in immunoglobulin-binding domains, ubiquitin, 2Fe-2 S ferredoxin and translation initiation factor 3 as identified by the SCOP database.

- Clostridioides difficile
- Clostridium perfringens (Clostridium enterotoxin)
- Vibrio cholerae (Cholera toxin)
- Staphylococcus aureus (Staphylococcal enterotoxin B)
- Yersinia enterocolitica
- Shigella dysenteriae (Shiga toxin)

=== Viral ===
Viruses in the families Reoviridae, Caliciviridae, and Astroviridae are responsible for a huge percentage of gastrointestinal disease worldwide. Rotaviruses (of Reoviridae) have been found to contain an enterotoxin which plays a role in viral pathogenesis. NSP4, is a protein that is made during the intracellular phase of the virion's life cycle and is known to have a primary function in intracellular virion maturation. However, when NSP4 from group A Rotaviruses was purified (4 alleles tested), concentrated, and injected into a mouse model, diarrheal disease mimicking that caused by Rotavirus infection commenced. A putative mode of toxicity is that NSP4 activates a signal transduction pathway that ultimately results in an increased cellular concentration of calcium and subsequent chloride secretion from the cell. Secretion of ions from villi lining the gut alter normal osmotic pressures and prevent uptake of water, eventually causing diarrhea.

- Rotavirus (NSP4)

== See also ==
- Endotoxin
- Exotoxin
