= Influenza non-structural protein =

Influenza non-structural protein (NS1)

Identifiers
- Symbol: Flu_NS1
- Pfam: PF00600
- InterPro: IPR000256
Available protein structures:
- PDB: PDB: 1ail PDB: 1ns1 IPR000256 PF00600 (ECOD; PDBsum)
- AlphaFold: IPR000256; PF00600

Influenza non-structural protein (NS1) is a homodimeric RNA-binding protein found in influenza virus that is required for viral replication. NS1 binds polyA tails of mRNA keeping them in the nucleus. NS1 inhibits pre-mRNA splicing by tightly binding to a specific stem-bulge of U6 snRNA.
