= Nordic Service Partners =

Nordic fast food franchisee

Nordic Service Partners Holding AB

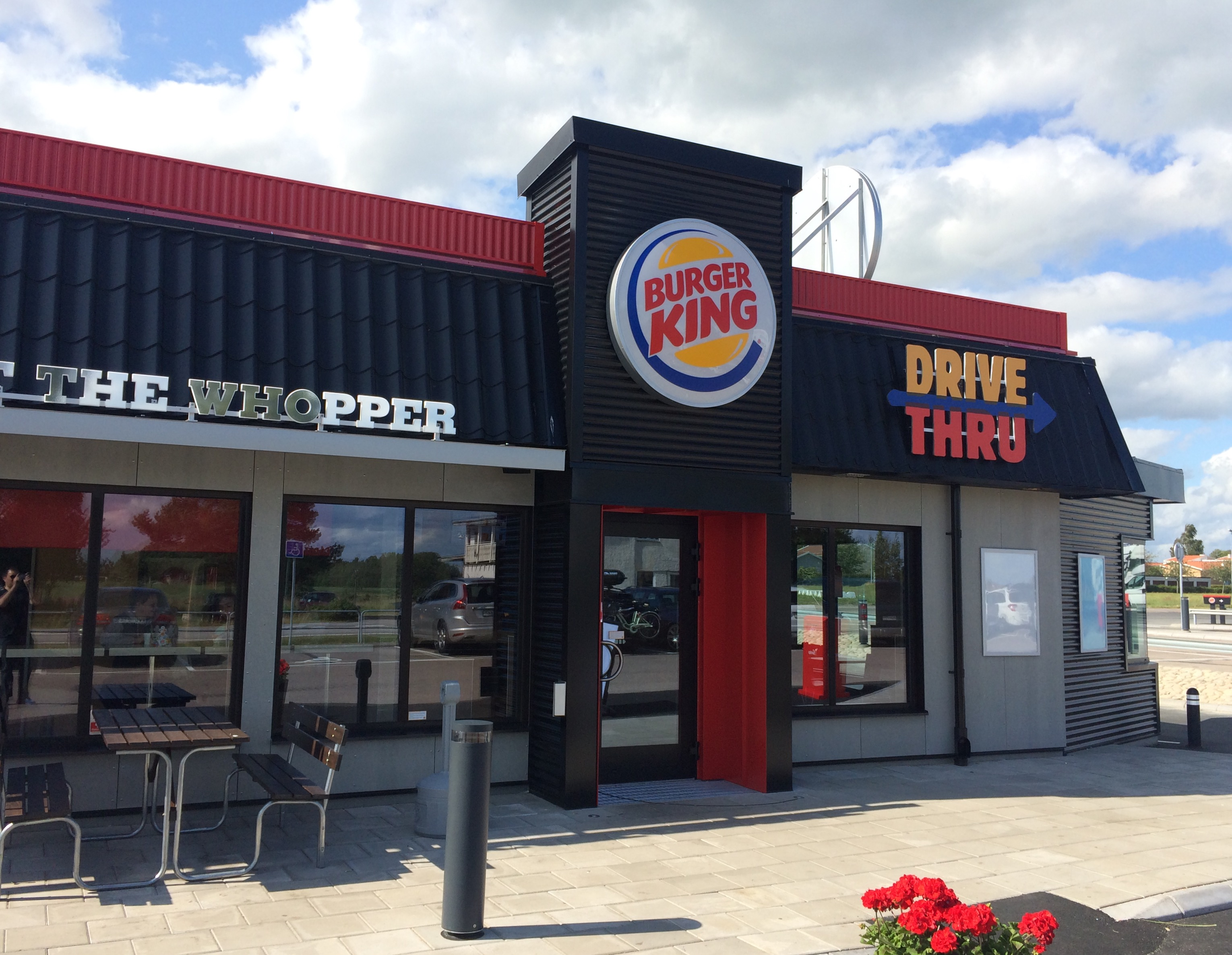
- Burger King in Brålanda, Sweden
- Industry: Fast food restaurants
- Founded: 2004
- Headquarters: Bromma, Sweden
- Area served: Sweden and Denmark
- Parent: Etib Holding
- Website: nordicservicepartners.se

Nordic Service Partners (NSP) is the largest franchisee of Burger King in the Nordic countries as well as being a franchisee of KFC in Sweden. The company is today one of Sweden's largest restaurant companies specialising in fast food restaurants.

== History ==
In 2004 NSP started operations with the purchase of 21 Burger King restaurants in Sweden from Burger King Corporation. In 2006 the company bought a chain of 7 Burger King restaurants from Cresco Food in Denmark and in the following year purchased 9 restaurants from Euroburger in southern Sweden. After further acquisitions and new-openings, the company operated over 60 Burger King restaurants in 2015.

NSP's Burger King restaurant on Gustav Adolfs torg in Malmö opened in 1976 as the first "BK" in Sweden and the Nordic countries. The company also runs Denmark's first BK which opened in 1977 on Vesterbrogade in Copenhagen, as the country's first American-style fast food restaurant.

Until 2014 NSP owned the Taco Bar brand with its 20 franchised Tex-Mex outlets in Sweden.

On 20 July 2016, NSP was de-listed on the Nasdaq Stockholm stock exchange, and became a fully owned subsidiary of Etib Holding II AB.

== KFC in Sweden ==
In 2014 NSP signed an agreement with Yum! Brands to launch KFC in Sweden. NSP's managing director Morgan Jallinder said: "As competition in the hamburger industry intensifies, we want to broaden operations and utilise our operational strength in other areas as well."

The first KFC restaurant in Sweden opened in Lockarp near Malmö in 2015. As of 2025 there were 24 restaurants in Sweden.

== NSP in Denmark ==
In 2014 the Danish press reported that NSP had been fined 50000 Danish Kroner for breaking working time regulations for foreign students. "We didn't know about the rule with the weekly time limit" said the company's Danish director Peter Nielsen.

NSP opened its first branch of TGI Fridays in Copenhagen, Denmark, in July 2015. The company invested 30 million kroner renovating the venue on Højbro Plads in the centre of Copenhagen. Operations of TGI Fridays in Denmark ceased in 2020.

In 2017 the Danish subsidiary of NSP made a loss of 6.7 million kroner, the fifth successive year of losses, which it blamed on the effects of construction work for the Copenhagen Metro.

In 2026, NSP became KFC's new franchisee in Denmark, after the bankruptcy of the previous franchise-holder.

== Image gallery of NSP restaurants ==
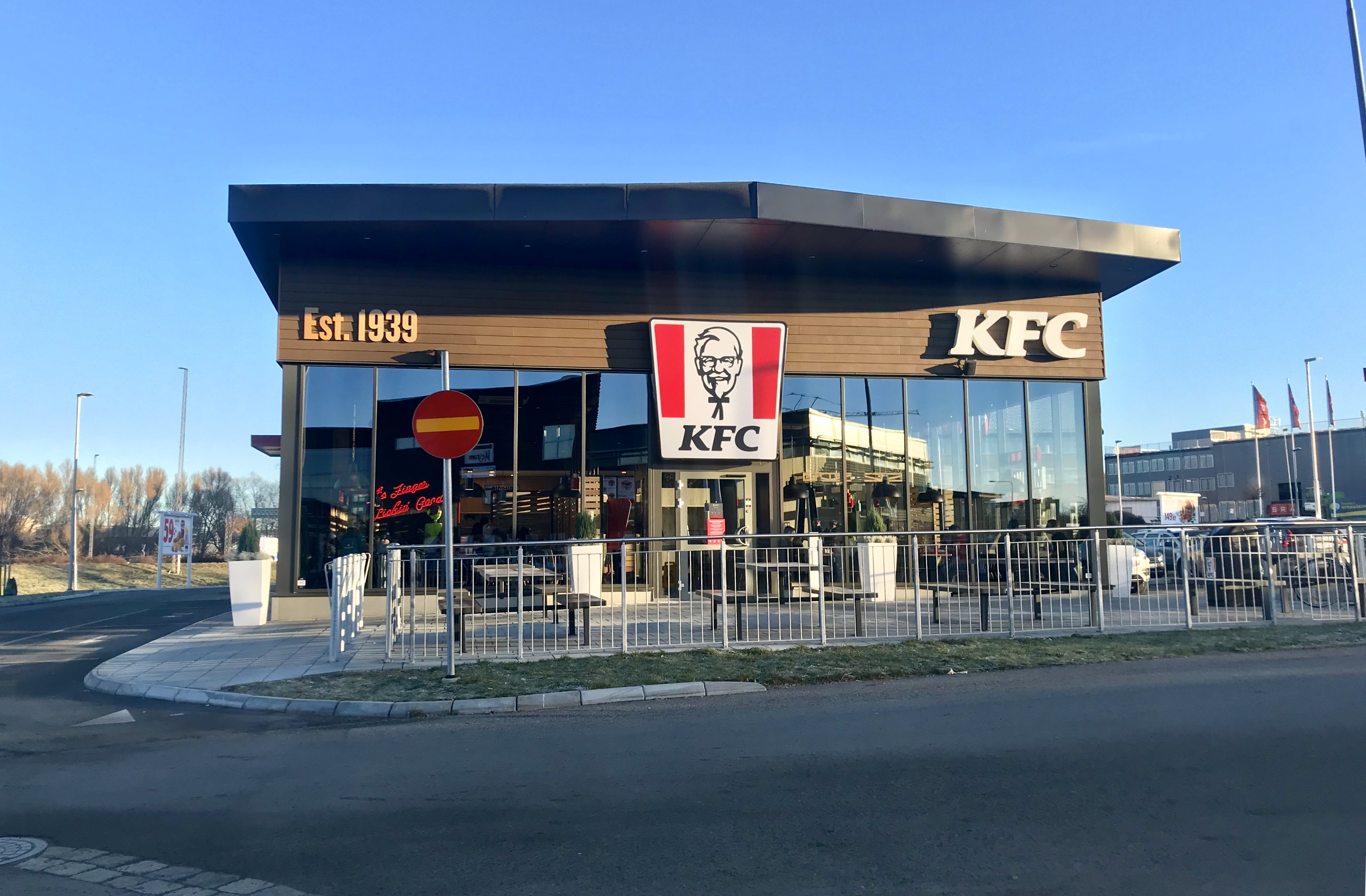
KFC in Mölndal

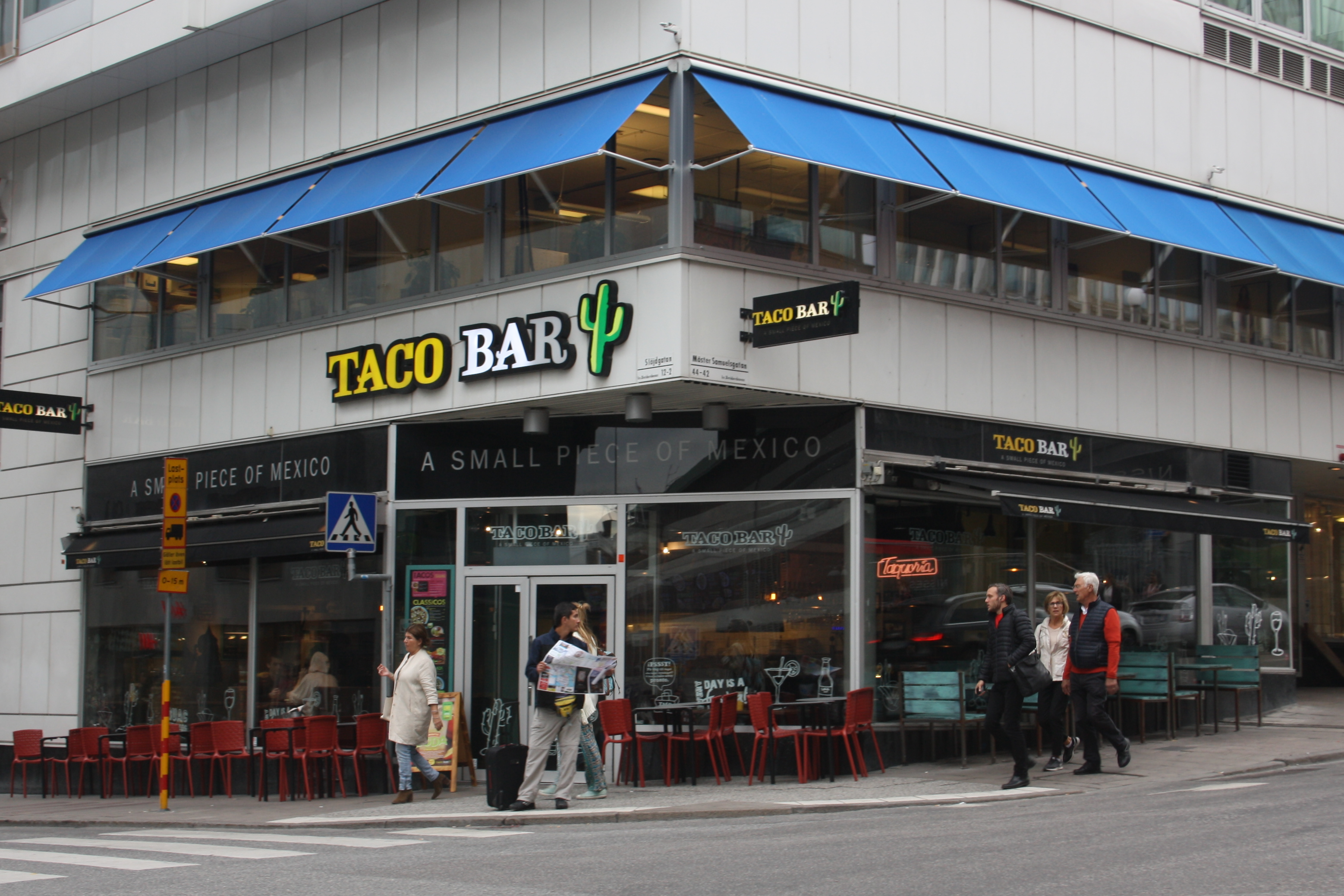
Taco Bar in Norrmalm, Stockholm

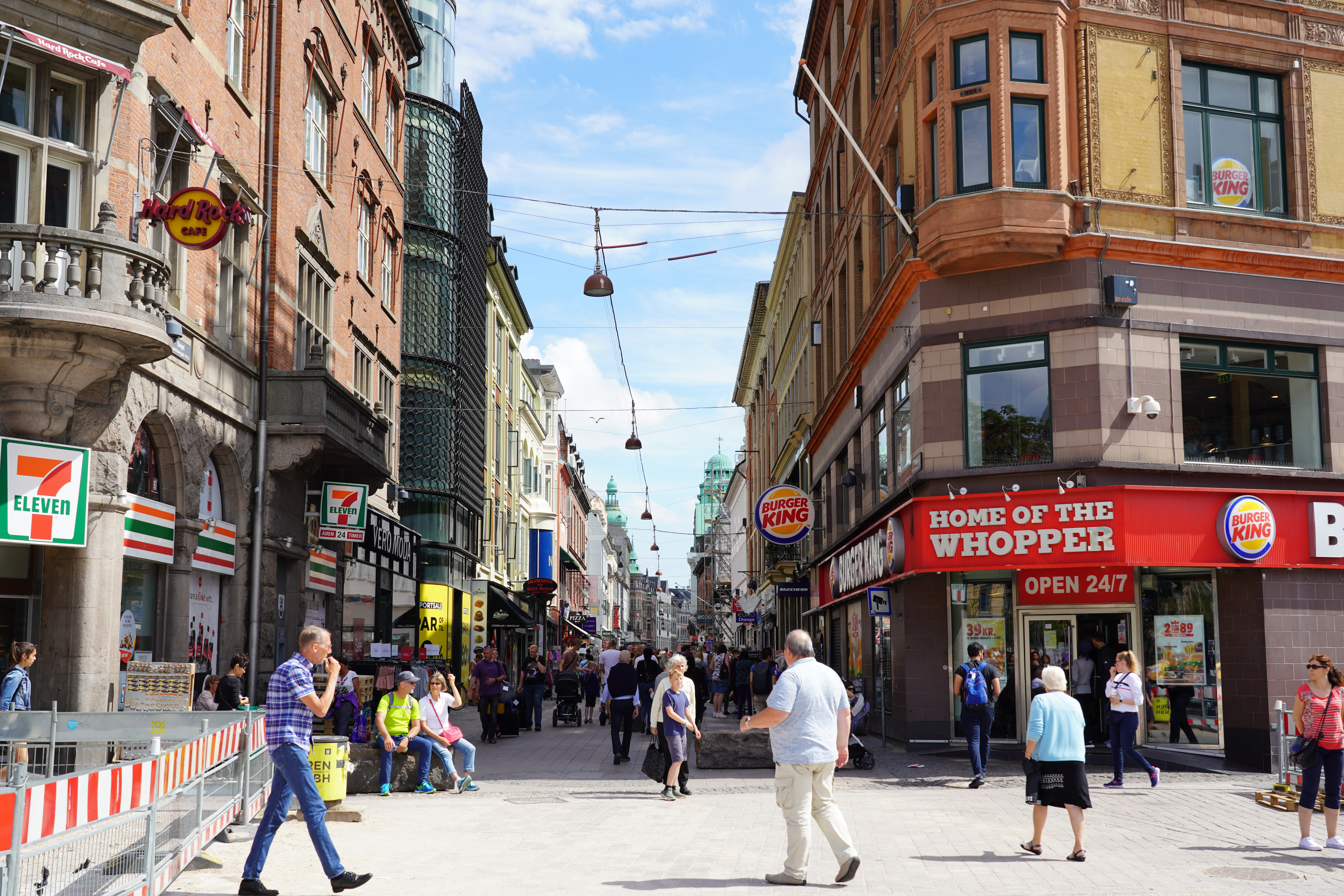
Burger King on Rådhuspladsen, Copenhagen

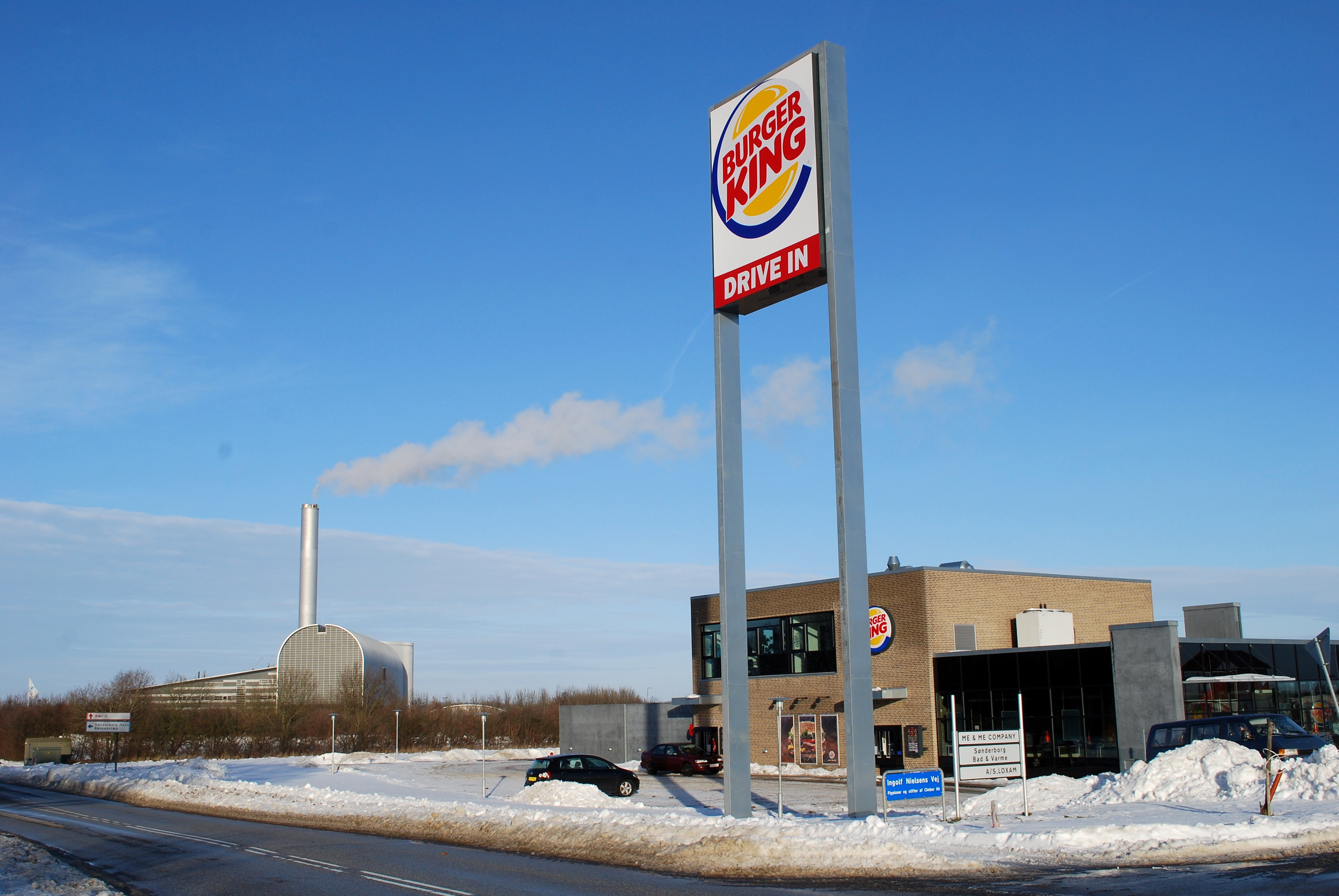
Burger King drive-thru, Sønderborg
