= NSP4 (rotavirus) =

Viral enterotoxin

Identifiers
- Symbol: Rota_NSP4
- Pfam: PF01452
- InterPro: IPR002107
- CATH: 1g1iA00
- SCOP2: 1g1i / SCOPe / SUPFAM
Available protein structures:
- PDB: IPR002107 PF01452 (ECOD; PDBsum)
- AlphaFold: IPR002107; PF01452

The rotavirus nonstructural protein NSP4 was the first viral enterotoxin discovered. It is a viroporin and induces diarrhea and causes Ca^{2+}-dependent transepithelial secretion.

A transmembrane glycoprotein, NSP4 is organized into three main domains: a three-helical TM domain in the N-terminus (also a viroporin domain), a central cytoplasmic coiled-coil domain for multimerization, and a C-terminal flexible region. It can also be secreted out of the cell. As of 2019, only structures of the central domain, which is responsible for diarrhea, has been solved. It oligomerizes into dimeric, tetrameric, pentameric, and even higher-order forms.
