= Ruth Bishop =

Australian virologist (1933–2022)

Ruth Bishop AC
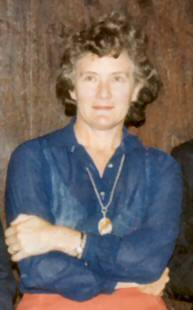
- Bishop c. 1980
- Born: Ruth Frances Langford; 12 May 1933; Dandenong, Victoria, Australia
- Died: 12 May 2022 (aged 89)
- Education: University of Melbourne
- Known for: Discovery of human rotavirus
- Awards: Officer of the Order of Australia (1996); Prince Mahidol Award (2011); Florey Medal (2013); Companion of the Order of Australia (2019)
- Scientific career
- Fields: Virology
- Workplaces: Royal Children's Hospital; World Health Organization; University of Melbourne

Ruth Frances Bishop AC (12 May 1933 – 12 May 2022) was an Australian virologist, who was a leading member of the team that discovered the human rotavirus.

== Biography ==
Bishop was born in Dandenong, Victoria, and grew up in Frankston where her father was principal of Frankston High School.

Bishop obtained a BSc., majoring in microbiology, in 1954 followed by a M. Sc. in the same field in 1958 and graduated with a PhD in microbiology in 1961. All of her undergraduate and graduate work was performed at the University of Melbourne.

In 1973, Bishop, along with Geoffrey Davidson (Royal Children's Hospital) and collaborators Ian Holmes and Brian Ruck (University of Melbourne), examined cells from the intestines of children with gastroenteritis. Intestinal biopsies were taken at the Royal Children's Hospital in Melbourne, Australia, and sent to Ian Holmes and Brian Ruck (University of Melbourne) to be examined by electron-microscopy.

Under the electron microscope cells were seen to be infected with viruses, which were originally named "duovirus" because they were seen in the duodenum and had a double capsid. The name "rotavirus" was later suggested by the Irishman, Thomas Henry Flewett, because of the round, wheel-like shape of virus particles. Rotaviruses cause diarrhoea and vomiting in young children and are a leading cause of death in the developing countries. Three thousand children are now hospitalised with rotavirus every year, down from 10,000 before the vaccine was introduced in 2007. Bishop said the invention of electron microscopy helped her make the discovery. The team's discovery led to a global effort to control of rotavirus.

Bishop also published theoretical works about the patterns in the epidemiology of rotavirus infection.

From 1983 to 1988, Bishop was Chair of the Committee on Diarrhoeal Diseases with the World Health Organization (WHO).

== Awards and honours ==
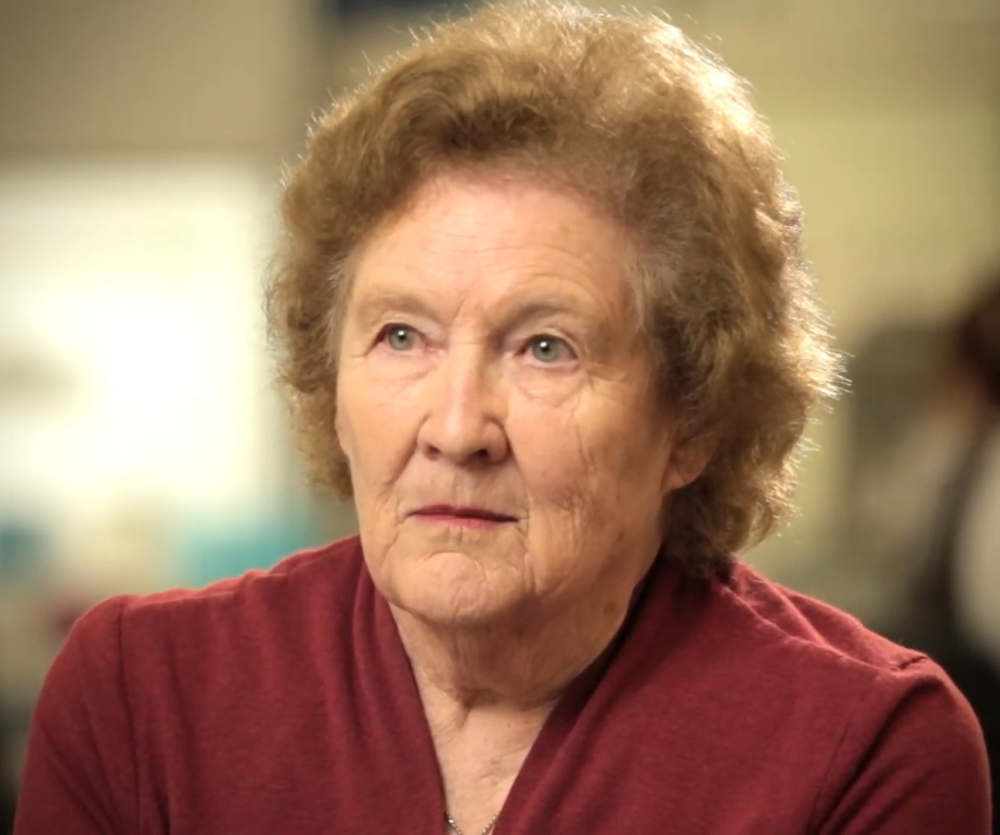
Bishop in 2013

Bishop was made an Officer of the Order of Australia (AO) in the 1996 Queen's Birthday Honours in recognition of service to medical research, particularly for her contributions to the understanding of gastroenteritis in children. In the 2019 Queen's Birthday Honours she was promoted to Companion of the Order of Australia (AC) for "eminent service to global child health through the development of improved vaccines for paediatric gastroenteritis, and to medical research".

In 2001, she was inducted to the Victorian Honour Roll of Women. In 2011, she received the Prince Mahidol Award awarded by the Thai Royal Family for outstanding achievement in public health.

Bishop was awarded the Florey Medal in 2013 for her discovery of rotavirus and subsequent work helping to develop a vaccine. The medal recognises significant achievements in biomedical research. This was the first time a woman was honoured with this award.

In 2020, the Melbourne-based Bio21 building announced Ruth Bishop as the namesake of their new imaging building, the "Ruth Bishop Building", housing the University of Melbourne's Ian Holmes Imaging Centre.
