= Omegasome =

Autophagy-related structure in cell biology

Figure from original paper, showing line diagrams of phagosomes arising from omegasomes (part D).

The omegasome is a cell organelle consisting of lipid bilayer membranes enriched with phosphatidylinositol 3-phosphate (abbreviated PI(3)P), and related to a process of autophagy. It is a subdomain of the endoplasmic reticulum (ER), and has a morphology resembling the Greek capital letter Omega (Ω). Omegasomes are the sites from which phagophores (also called "isolation membranes") form, which are sack-like structures that mature into autophagosomes, and fuse with lysosomes in order to degrade the contents of the autophagosomes. The formation of omegasomes depends on various factors, however in general, formation of omegasomes is increased as a response to starvation, and in some biochemical situations the presence of PI(3)P leads to the formation of omegasomes.

== Discovery ==
Omegasomes were first discovered by researchers in 2008 as specialized structures that play a key role in the formation of autophagosomes, the central organelle in macroautophagy. In a study observing the movement and localization of double FYVE domain-containing protein 1 (DFCP1), a phosphatidylinositol 3-phosphate (PI(3)P) binding marker, researchers found that this protein would localize to a ring-shaped structure on the endoplasmic reticulum. Because of their ring-shaped morphology, which resembled the Greek capital letter Omega (Ω), researchers named these structures omegasomes. It was also found that omegasomes are enriched with PI(3)P, a phospholipid that plays an important role in membrane signaling and trafficking. PI(3)P is produced by class III phosphatidylinositol 3-kinase complexes (PI3KC3), primarily involving Vps34 and Beclin1, and researchers found that its recognition is crucial for the formation of omegasomes. Further examination of the omegasomes using live imaging indicated that there is a dynamic connection between the omegasomes and the endoplasmic reticulum, leading researchers to conclude that the omegasomes serve as an interface between the ER and autophagic machinery. The discovery of omegasomes has provided a missing link in the understanding of autophagosome biogenesis and autophagy initiation and has opened the door to new avenues of research where autophagy may be involved. Subsequent studies have already revealed more about omegasome maturation, their interactions with other organelles, and their roles in more selective autophagy processes, such as mitophagy and xenophagy. Additionally, omegasomes will be of particular interest in future research of conditions such as cancer, neurodegenerative diseases, and various infections where autophagy plays an important role.

== Structure ==
Omegasomes have a very distinct morphology, as they appear as ring-like or cup-shaped protrusions that resemble the Greek capital letter Omega. This unique structure is what gives omegasomes their name. These protrusions extend from the ER membrane, and the structures typically have a diameter of about 1.0 micrometers. DFCP1 can be used to visualize these structures as it binds to PI(3)P through its FYVE domains and accumulates at the omegasome formation site, outlining its shape. The formation of omegasomes is a very dynamic process that occurs within three minutes of autophagy induction. Before omegasome formation begins, the mechanistic target of rapamycin complex 1 (mTORC1) must be inactivated due to amino acid starvation or the activation of AMP-activated protein kinase (AMPK) due to glucose starvation. The inactivation of mTORC1 leads to the activation of the UNC51-like kinase (ULK1) complex, and the activity of ULK1 promotes autophagy. ULK1 and PI3KC complexes are recruited to the ER and catalyze the production of PI(3)P, initiating the formation of omegasomes. The growth of the omegasome is sustained by the production of PI(3)P, and this step in omegasome formation is why they are so enriched with PI(3)P. Once formed, omegasomes serve as a scaffolding for the nucleation of phagophores, which are a precursor to autophagosomes.

== Function ==
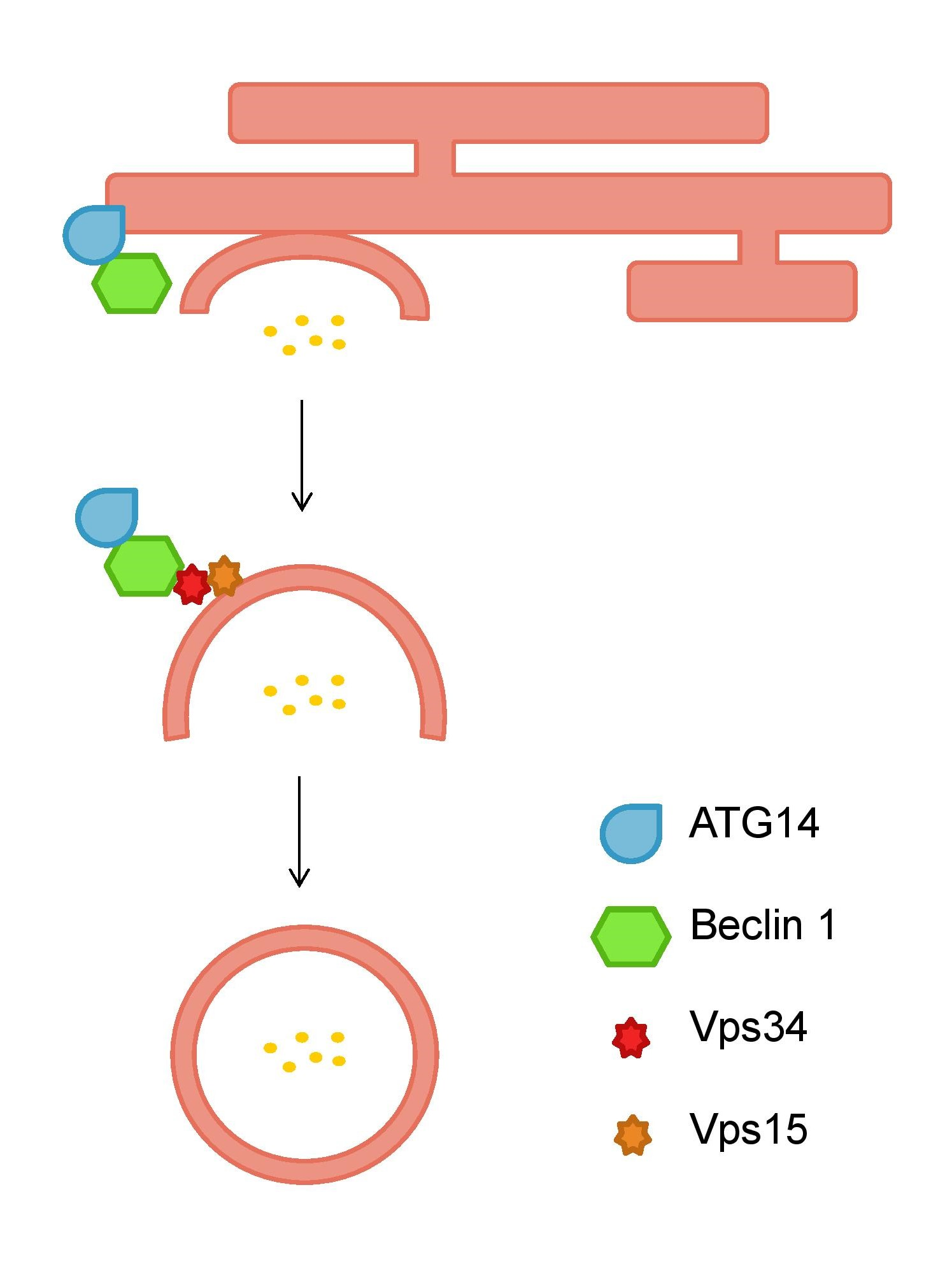
The PIK3C3 complex in vesicle nucleation of an autophagosome from an omegasome.

Omegasomes serve as an important intermediate in the formation of autophagosomes, which are the primary organelle in a process known as autophagy. Autophagy (from Greek words for "self" and "eating") is a process of digesting or degrading cytoplasmic molecules (proteins, lipids, sugars and organelles). Macroautophagy is the main autophagic pathway, used primarily to eradicate damaged cell organelles such as mitochondria, ribosomes, etc., which helps in supplying amino acids and energy to the cells, and maintains longevity. Omegasomes, enriched with PI(3)P and PI(3)P-binding proteins, are positioned on the ER to serve as a scaffolding for the nucleation of phagophores, a double-membraned sequestering structure that matures into an autophagosome. Additionally, omegasomes attract the effectors needed to target PI3P, while also ensuring that the autophagosomal membranes fuse with the double membrane vesicles and promote autophagosome formation. ATG9 vesicles, which come from the Golgi apparatus, have been proposed as the membrane seed for the phagophore formation, and the contact between the omegasome and the phagophore are initiated by these ATG9-positive seed vesicles. The omegasome remains present at the opening of the sack-like phagophore while items destined for degradation by macroautophagy are loaded into the phagophore. There are specific receptor proteins that recruit items to the phagophore. The phagophore expands to accommodate the items, until the omegasome is closed to produce the roughly spherical autophagosome. DFCP1's ATPase activity is believed to play a role in detaching the mature autophagosome from the omegasome, and autophagocytosis associated protein Atg3 and other proteins appear to be required as well. Additionally, collections of thin tubules at the junction between omegasome and phagophore and actin appear to be involved. Ultimately, omegasomes play a vital role in autophagy, and the omegasome regulation of this pathway provides a smooth transition of autophagosome formation and enrichment of nutrients in the cells.

== Clinical relevance ==
=== Neurodegenerative diseases ===
One of the most prominent areas of clinical relevance for omegasomes is in neurodegenerative diseases such as Alzheimer's disease, Parkinson's disease, Huntington's disease, and Amyotrophic Lateral Sclerosis. The accumulation of misfolded, aggregated proteins is a hallmark feature of neurodegenerative diseases. Autophagy is a key mechanism that allows cells to degrade and remove these toxic proteins, and because of the essential role that omegasomes play in autophagy, defective omegasome function, which is being investigated for several diseases, can impair the autophagy process. The impairment of autophagy can lead to an accumulation of these harmful proteins, contributing to neuronal death and disease progression.

==== Alzheimer's Disease (AD) ====
One of the characteristic features of Alzheimer's disease is the accumulation of plaques (formed by clumped amyloid beta proteins, bits of degenerating neurons, and other cell debris) and neurofibrillary tangles (primarily made up of hyperphosphorylated tau proteins). These plaques and tangles interfere with the communication between nerve cells and cause cell damage and death. It is uncertain of the exact role that autophagy plays in AD pathogenesis, but evidence suggests that AD-related proteins may be selectively degraded through the autophagy process, known as aggregaphy, and that impairment or reduction of this process may play a role in AD development and progression. Because of this, regulation of the autophagy pathway could be a viable method for modulating the formation of protein aggregates associated with AD and is being explored as a potential therapeutic strategy for the treatment of AD.

==== Parkinson's Disease (PD) ====
Some of the characteristic features of Parkinson's disease are the degeneration of dopaminergic neurons in the substantia nigra and the accumulation of Lewy bodies, abnormal clumps of misfolded α-synuclein proteins in the brain. The loss of dopaminergic neurons leads to a decrease in dopamine production that results in motor impairment, and the accumulation of Lewy bodies can cause the disruption of normal brain cell function, interference with neurotransmitter release, and eventually cell death. The aggregation of α-synuclein proteins that lead to the formation of Lewy bodies is caused by an impairment in the autophagy pathway. Overexpression of α-synuclein has been associated with a disruption of autophagy initiation in some cases of PD, possibly through mislocalization of ATG9 that may impair omegasome formation. With omegasome formation inhibited, autophagosome initiation is disrupted, impairing the overall autophagy process, which reduces the removal of α-synuclein and allows disease progression. Targeting the autophagy-lysosomal pathway could be a possible therapeutic strategy for treating PD.

== See also ==
- Autophagosomes
- Autophagy
