= Viroplasm =

Inclusion body where viruses replicate

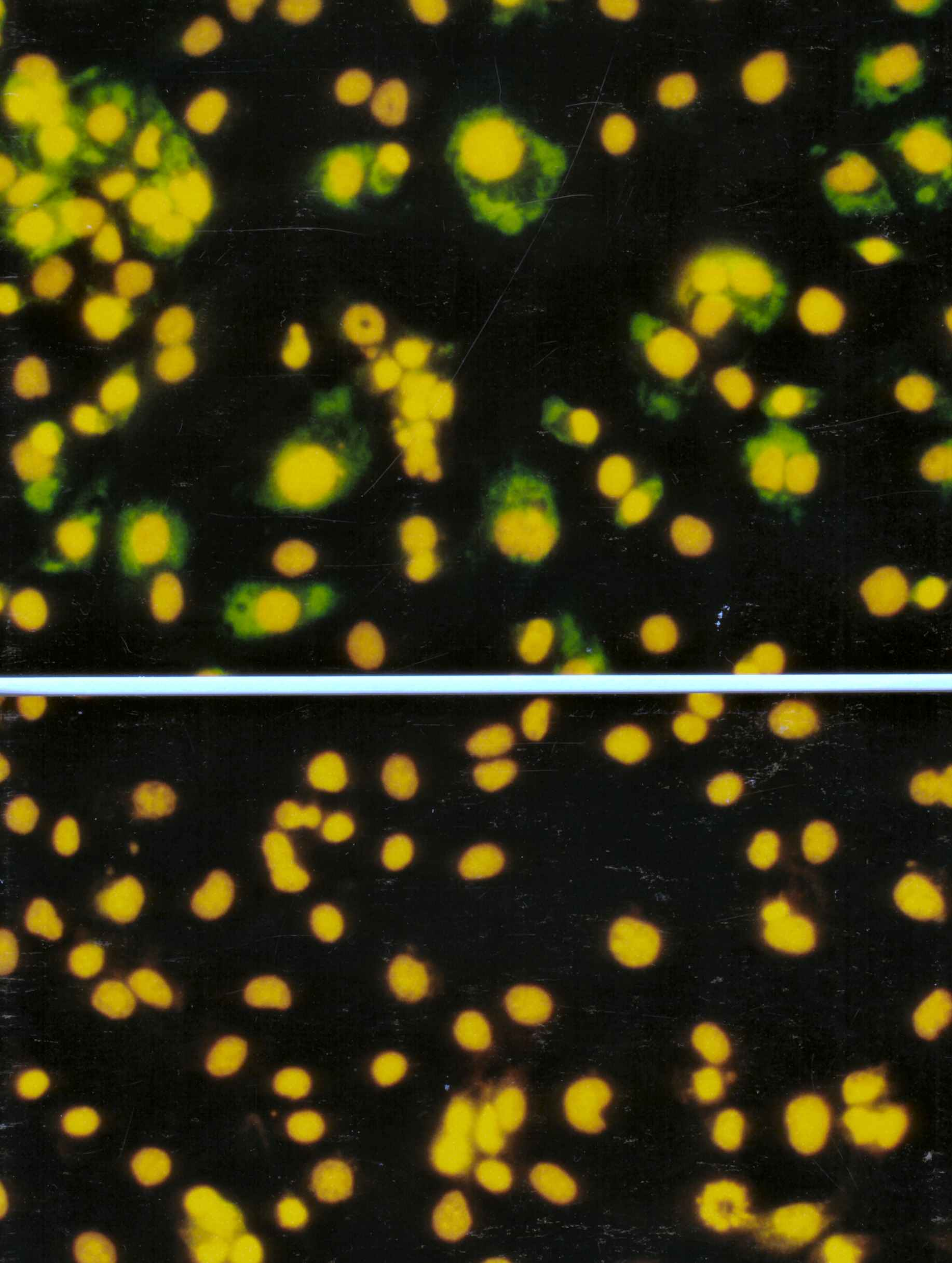
Viroplasms (green) in cells infected with rotavirus (top), and uninfected cells (bottom). (Immunofluorescent stain)

A viroplasm, sometimes called "virus factory" or "virus inclusion", is an inclusion body in a cell where viral replication and assembly occurs. They may be thought of as viral factories in the cell. There can be many viroplasms in one infected cell, where they appear dense to electron microscopy. Very little is understood about the mechanism of viroplasm formation.

== Definition ==
A viroplasm is a perinuclear or a cytoplasmic large compartment where viral replication and assembly occurs. The viroplasm formation is caused by the interactions between the virus and the infected cell, where viral products and cell elements are confined.

== Groups of viruses that form viroplasms ==
Viroplasms have been reported in many unrelated groups of Eukaryotic viruses that replicate in cytoplasm, however, viroplasms from plant viruses have not been as studied as viroplasms from animal viruses. Viroplasms have been found in the cauliflower mosaic virus, rotavirus, vaccinia virus and the rice dwarf virus. These appear electron-dense under an electron microscope and are insoluble.

Baltimore's classification	Family	Species
I: dsDNA viruses	Poxviridae; Asfarviridae; Iridoviridae; Mimiviridae Herpesviridae	vaccinia virus African swine fever virus frog virus Acanthamoeba polyphaga mimivirus Pithovirus Herpes simplex virus
II: ssDNA viruses
III: dsRNA viruses	Reoviridae	Avian reovirus
IV: (+)ssRNA viruses	Togaviridae; Flaviviridae	Rubella virus Flavivirus
V: (−)ssRNA viruses	Rhabdoviridae Peribunyaviridae	Rabies virus Orthobunyavirus
VI: ssRNA-RT viruses	Retroviridae	Human immunodeficiency virus
VII: dsDNA-RT viruses	Caulimoviridae	Cauliflower mosaic virus

== Structure and formation ==
Viroplasms are localized in the perinuclear area or in the cytoplasm of infected cells and are formed early in the infection cycle. The number and the size of viroplasms depend on the virus, the virus isolate, hosts species, and the stage of the infection. For example, viroplasms of mimivirus have a similar size to the nucleus of its host, the amoeba Acanthamoeba polyphaga.

A virus can induce changes in composition and organization of host cell cytoskeletal and membrane compartments, depending on the step of the viral replication cycle. This process involves a number of complex interactions and signaling events between viral and host cell factors.

Viroplasms are formed early during the infection; in many cases, the cellular rearrangements caused during virus infection lead to the construction of sophisticated inclusions —viroplasms— in the cell where the factory will be assembled. The viroplasm is where components such as replicase enzymes, virus genetic material, and host proteins required for replication concentrate, and thereby increase the efficiency of replication. At the same time, large amounts of ribosomes, protein-synthesis components, protein folding chaperones, and mitochondria are recruited. Some of the membrane components are used for viral replication while some others will be modified to produce viral envelopes, when the viruses are enveloped. The viral replication, protein synthesis and assembly require a considerable amount of energy, provided by large clusters of mitochondria at the periphery of viroplasms. The virus factory is often enclosed by a membrane derived from the rough endoplasmic reticulum or by cytoskeletal elements.

In animal cells, virus particles are gathered by the microtubule-dependent aggregation of toxic or misfolded protein near the microtubule organizing center (MTOC), so the viroplasms of animal viruses are generally localized near the MTOC. MTOCs are not found in plant cells. Plant viruses induce the rearrangement of membranes structures to form the viroplasm. This is mostly shown for plant RNA viruses.

== Functions ==
Viroplasm is the location within the infected cell where viral replication and assembly take place. Wrapping the viroplasm with a membrane, concentrates the viral components required for the genome replication and the morphogenesis of new virus particles, so it increases the efficiency of the processes. The recruitment of cellular membranes and cytoskeleton to generate virus replication sites can also benefit viruses in other ways. Disruption of cellular membranes can, for example, slow the transport of immunomodulatory proteins to the surface of infected cells and protect against innate and acquired immune responses, and rearrangements to cytoskeleton can facilitate virus release. The viroplasm could also prevent virus degradation by proteases and nucleases.

In the case of the Cauliflower mosaic virus (CaMV), viroplasms improve the virus transmission by the aphid vector. Viroplasms also control release of virions when the insect stings an infected plant cell or a cell near the infected cells.

== Possible co-evolution with the host ==
Aggregated structures may protect viral functional complexes from the cellular degradation systems. For example, formation of viral factories of the ASFV viroplasm is very similar to the aggresome formation. An aggresome is a perinuclear site where misfolded proteins are transported and stored by the cell components for their destruction. It has been proposed that the viroplasm could be the product of a co-evolution between the virus and its host. It is possible that a cellular response originally designed to reduce the toxicity of misfolded proteins is exploited by cytoplasmic viruses to improve their replication, the virus capsid synthesis, and assembly. Alternatively, the activation of host defense mechanisms may involve sequestration of virus components in aggregates to prevent their dissemination, followed by their neutralisation. For example, viroplasms of mammalian viruses contain certain elements of the cellular degradation machinery which might enable cellular protective mechanisms against viral components. Given the co-evolution of viruses with their host cells, changes in cell structure induced during infection are likely to involve a combination of the two strategies.

== Use in diagnostics ==
Presence of viroplasms is used to diagnose certain viral infections. Understanding the phenomena of virus aggregation and of the cell response to the presence of virus, and whether viroplasms facilitate or inhibit viral replication, may help to develop new therapeutic approaches against virus infections in animal and plant cells.

== See also ==
- Viral evolution
- Nucleocytoviricota
- Viral eukaryogenesis
