= Hot Soup Processor =

Japanese programming language

- Paradigm: Procedural, Imperative
- Designed by: ONION software()
- Developer: ONION software()
- First appeared: 1996
- Stable release: 3.51 / Apr 13, 2019
- Preview release: 3.6RC2 / Jul 31, 2021
- OS: Windows
- License: BSD licenses
- Website: hsp.tv

Influenced by
- BASIC, C

Hot Soup Processor is a programming language from Japan that was originally developed in 1994. It was originally based on BASIC, but has diverged significantly from those roots over the years. It is freeware as of 1996, and now is open source (OpenHSP) under the BSD licenses. HSP is used to teach programming in Japanese schools, and because it is freeware, it was a popular programming language for doujin soft in the late 1990s.

== Features ==
Hot Soup Processor is a procedural language, and includes the following features:

- Very brief and simple syntax, ideal for beginning programmers
- no line numbering
- non-case-sensitive
- all variables are global
- name spaces
- Originally designed to compile Windows executables, but Mac Classic and Linux ports exist as well, and compiling to .com files is also possible
- Can use Windows DLLs and Windows API
- includes a preprocessor
- can use standard BASIC syntax as well as its own proprietary syntax

== Example code ==
mes "Hello World!"
stop
