= Host signal processing =

Host signal processing (HSP) is a term used in computing to describe hardware such as a modem or printer which is emulated (to various degrees) in software. Intel refers to the technology as native signal processing (NSP). HSP replaces dedicated DSP or ASIC hardware by using the general purpose CPU of the host computer.

Modems using HSP are known as winmodems (a term trademarked by 3COM / USRobotics, but genericized) or softmodems. Printers using HSP are known as GDI printers (after the MS Windows GDI software interface), winprinters (named after winmodems) or softprinters.

The Apple II Disk II floppy drive used the host CPU to process drive control signals, instead of a microcontroller. This instance of HSP predates the usage of the terms HSP and NSP.

In the mid- to late-1990s, Intel pursued native signal processing technology to improve multimedia handling. According to testimony by Intel, Microsoft opposed development of NSP because the technology could reduce the necessity of the Microsoft Windows operating system. Intel claims to have terminated development of NSP because of threats from Microsoft.

== See also ==
- Bit banging
