= Viral nonstructural protein =

In virology, a nonstructural protein is a protein encoded by a virus but that is not part of the viral particle. They typically include the various enzymes and transcription factors the virus uses to replicate itself, such as a viral protease (3CL/nsp5, etc.), an RNA replicase or other template-directed polymerases, and some means to control the host.

== Examples ==
- NSP1 (rotavirus)
- NSP4 (rotavirus)
- NSP5 (rotavirus)
- Influenza non-structural protein
- NS1 influenza protein
- HBcAg, core antigen of hepatitis B
- Bunyaviridae nonstructural S proteins

== See also ==
- Viral structural protein
