= Abaca bunchy top virus =

Virus classification
- (unranked): Virus
- Realm: Monodnaviria
- Kingdom: Shotokuvirae
- Phylum: Cressdnaviricota
- Class: Arfiviricetes
- Order: Mulpavirales
- Family: Nanoviridae
- Genus: Babuvirus
- Species: Babuvirus abacae

Species of virus

Abaca bunchy top virus (ABTV) is a pathogenic plant virus of the family Nanoviridae. ABTV has been isolated from both abacá (Musa textilis) and banana (Musa sp.). ABTV has many similarities to Banana bunchy top virus (BBTV) but is both genetically and serologically distinct in that it lacks two open reading frames found in BBTV's genome. ATBV's genome contains six circular components, each of which are 1,000-1,500 base pairs in length.

== Spread ==
The virus, first detected in 1915 at Silang, Cavite, Philippines, has since spread to various provinces in the country, and damaged more than 8,000 ha (20,000 acres) of abacá plantations in 2002 alone.

== Resistance ==
In 2009, University of the Philippines Los Baños researchers funded by the Department of Agriculture developed an abacá variety that is resistant to the ABTV. The university is working further to make it resistant to mosaic and abacá bract mosaic viruses.
