= Bovine stool associated circular virus =

Virus classification
- Group: Group II (ssDNA)

Bovine stool associated circular virus is a single stranded DNA virus with a circular genome that was isolated from bovine stool. It has also been isolated from pig stool. Therefore, Porcine stool-associated circular virus, a proposed species not yet been accepted by the ICTV, appears to be a synonym.

== Virology ==
This virus was isolated from cows and pigs that appeared to be healthy.

== Genome ==
The genome is a single stranded circular DNA molecule 2600 bases in length. It has two open reading frames encoding a replicase and capsid protein. The reading frames are arranged in opposite orientations on the genome. A stem loop is present between the 3' ends of the open reading frames. This is like chimpanzee stool associated circular virus and unlike any other known circular DNA virus.

== Taxonomy ==
This virus appears to form a clade with the chimpanzee stool associated circular virus. Their relationship with other viruses is not yet known. The closest relations appear to be the Nanoviridae but further work is required to clarify this point.

However, Porcine stool-associated circular virus appears to be an unclassified member of ICTV-accepted genus Porprismacovirus in family Smacoviridae, same as chimpanzee stool associated circular virus. Nanoviridae and Smacoviridae are both members of class Arfiviricetes.
