= Babuvirus =

Virus classification
- (unranked): Virus
- Realm: Monodnaviria
- Kingdom: Shotokuvirae
- Phylum: Cressdnaviricota
- Class: Arfiviricetes
- Order: Mulpavirales
- Family: Nanoviridae
- Genus: Babuvirus

Genus of viruses

Babuvirus is a genus of viruses, in the family Nanoviridae. Musa species serve as natural hosts. There are three species in this genus. Diseases associated with this genus include: stunting, severe necrosis and early plant death. BBTV induces banana bunchy top disease (BBTD).

== Taxonomy ==
The genus contains the following species, listed by scientific name and followed by the exemplar virus of the species:

- Babuvirus abacae, Abaca bunchy top virus
- Babuvirus cardamomi, Cardamom bushy dwarf virus
- Babuvirus musae, Banana bunchy top virus

== Structure and genome ==
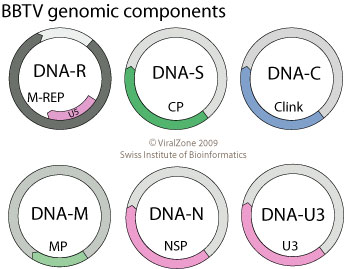
Genome map of species Banana bunchy top virus (BBTV) showing six segments.

Viruses in the genus Babuvirus are non-enveloped, with icosahedral and round geometries, and T=1 symmetry. The diameter is around 18-19 nm.

Genomes are multipartite with 6 to 8 circular segments. Genome size is around 81 kb in totsl.

| Genus | Structure | Symmetry | Capsid | Genomic arrangement | Genomic segmentation |
|---|---|---|---|---|---|
| Babuvirus | Icosahedral | T=1 | Non-enveloped | Circular | Segmented |

== Life cycle ==
Viral replication is nuclear. Entry into the host cell is achieved by penetration into the host cell. Replication follows the ssDNA rolling circle model. DNA templated transcription is the method of transcription. The virus exits the host cell by nuclear pore export, and tubule-guided viral movement. Musa species serve as the natural host. The virus is transmitted via a vector (aphids). Transmission routes are vector.

| Genus | Host details | Tissue tropism | Entry details | Release details | Replication site | Assembly site | Transmission |
|---|---|---|---|---|---|---|---|
| Babuvirus | Plants: musa species | Phloem | Viral movement; mechanical inoculation | Secretion; viral movement | Nucleus | Nucleus | Aphids |
