= Banana bunchy top virus =

Virus classification
- (unranked): Virus
- Realm: Floreoviria
- Kingdom: Shotokuvirae
- Phylum: Cressdnaviricota
- Class: Arfiviricetes
- Order: Mulpavirales
- Family: Nanoviridae
- Genus: Babuvirus
- Species: Babuvirus musae

Species of virus

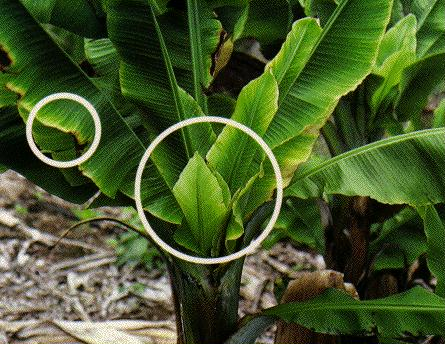
Banana bunchy top virus causes new leaves to be stunted and "bunchy", while leaf edges are deformed and yellow

Banana bunchy top virus (BBTV) is a plant pathogenic virus of the family Nanoviridae known for infecting banana plants and other crops. It is aphid transmitted.

== Definition ==
Banana bunchy top is a viral disease caused by a single-stranded DNA virus called the banana bunchy top virus (BBTV). It was first identified in Fiji in 1879, and has spread around the world since then. Like many viruses, BBTV was named after the symptoms seen, where the infected plants are stunted and have "bunchy" leaves at the top. The disease is transmitted from plant-to-plant in tropical regions of the world by aphids, banana aphids which can also feed on Heliconia and flowering ginger (from the family Zingiberaceae), which is an important factor in control of the disease. There are no resistant varieties, so controlling the spread by vectors and plant materials are the only management methods.

== Transmission ==
All babuviruses are aphid transmitted including BBTV. Information is lacking regarding vector-virus interactions.

== Host and symptoms ==
Banana bunchy top disease affects the banana fruit and foliage, and is caused by a single-strand DNA virus, the banana bunchy top virus. BBTV can infect species of the family Musaceae, which includes bananas, plantains, abaca, and more. The aphids also feed on Heliconia and flowering ginger, which are grown in the same regions as bananas and must be considered in management of the disease. It is best to establish a banana production area where these alternate hosts are not present. Any age plants can be infected by this virus, but some varieties of banana, including the Cavendish, are more susceptible to the virus. In areas where the virus is less common, the disease is usually spread by planting diseased suckers at the beginning of the season, which means the season is started with a diseased crop.

The pathogen causes cytopathological effects in the phloem tissue, which is the damaging of the host cells caused by the virus. The damage causes many effects that help to diagnose and characterize the disease. The name of the disease comes from the symptom which occurs in older plants, in which the new leaves that are produced are narrower than normal, yellow, and flat, which causes a "bunchy" appearance at the top of the tree. If any fruit is produced, which is unusual, it will be deformed. In addition, one of the most distinctive symptoms is "Morse code streaking" where the infected cells die and are lighter in color, causing irregular spots and dashes on the leaves that are easier to see when the waxy coating over the petiole is rubbed away.

== Distribution ==
BBTV is a widespread disease in the tropics, and is present in Southeast Asia, the Philippines, Taiwan, Oceania including most of the South Pacific islands and Hawaii, Pakistan (first found 1988, first identified 1991 or 1992), East Asia, parts of India, and Africa. It is especially problematic in East Asia, Oceania, and Hawaii. It was first observed in Hawaii in 1989, and is now widespread on Oahu, in the Kona area, and on Kauai. The disease is currently not present in Central or South America. The pathogen is not present everywhere bananas are grown, but is present in most areas where the vector is also present. These aphids are most likely native to Southeast Asia, but they are present in most areas in the tropics, and almost everywhere bananas are grown. BBTV is spread to new areas by poor agricultural practices, and can be transmitted on plant material from the family Musaceae, the virus' host.

== Disease cycle ==
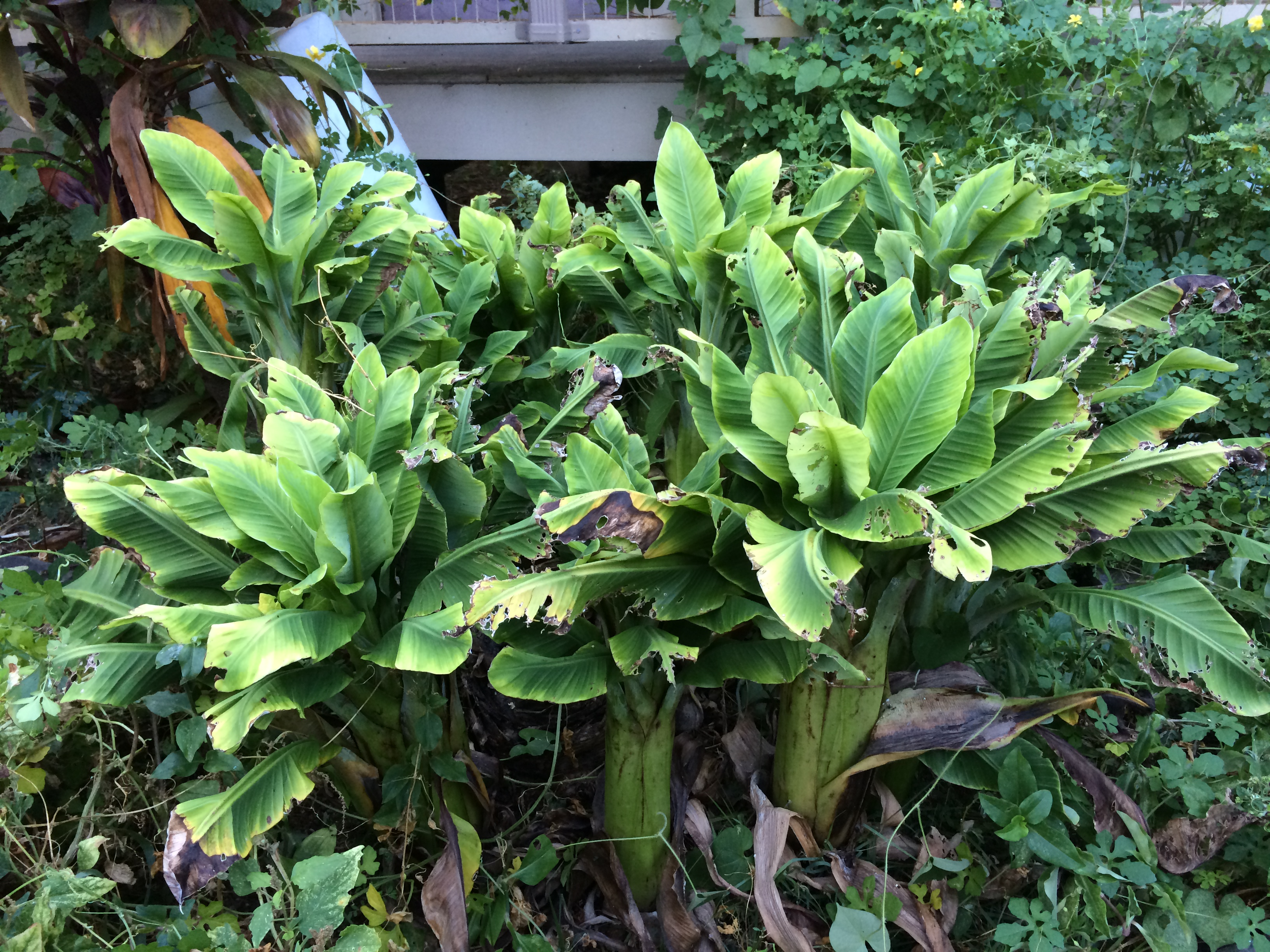
A banana plant affected by bunchy top virus

BBTV is the sole member of the genus Babuvirus in the family Nanoviridae. The genome of BBTV is made up of at least six circular, single-stranded DNA components, each about 1 kilo-base pair in length. Replication takes place by rolling circle replication, a unidirectional nucleic acid replication that can result in rapid synthesis of single-strands of DNA. There are specific virus-like particles that have been proposed as the virions of BBTV but there are still discrepancies in the scientific world about the exact relationship between these virions and the single-stranded DNA virus. Nevertheless, it was demonstrated that the associated ssDNA molecules are transmitted with the disease and therefore are designated as the pathogen.

It is known that Banana aphid (Pentalonia nigronervosa) transmits the virus from infected to healthy plants by feeding. Aphids feed on the plant phloem tissues by injecting their thin, flexible stylet into the epidermis of the plant tissue until it reaches the phloem of the leaves. Then the aphid injects saliva and sucks the cell contents. This ingestion of viral components is done inadvertently by the aphid. Vector transmission of the BBTV is circulative and non-propagative, meaning that transmission of the virus occurs from and to the phloem tissues and the virus does not replicate within the aphid’s midgut. Acquisition of the virus by the banana aphid requires about 18 hours of feeding and then the aphid can retain the virus for approximately two weeks. The retransmission of this virus can happen after as little as two hours of feeding on a healthy plant however it takes about a month for the BBTV symptoms to appear after infection. To infect, the carrier aphid can feed on the banana plant for as few as 15 minutes, but more often a couple hours, as the longer feeding time will increase the odds of transmission. The suckers produced on infected plants that would usually be used for planting the next season will also be diseased, which is one way the disease can spread from year to year. Banana aphids also have the capability to feed on Heliconia and flowering ginger; however, these alternate hosts of the aphid vector are not hosts of the virus. The ability of banana aphids to feed on alternate hosts is important to keep in mind when attempting to control the virus.

== Management ==
There are no resistant varieties of banana against BBTV, so the most common method of control is chemical control of the aphid vectors. Another way to help control the virus is to remove and destroy any infected plants before the virus can spread, which is a practice known as roguing. Quarantines are also implemented to prevent the import of any potentially infected plant materials, including one in Hawaii that prevents the movement of anything except fruits from the island of Oahu to any other island, since BBTV is widespread in Oahu. Fruit is not often produced on infected plants, but if it is, the fruit will be deformed, which easily identifies if there is any virus present in the fruits to comply with quarantine regulations. Since bananas are not the only host, the alternate hosts for both the virus and the aphid must also be monitored for disease, and sprayed with pesticides to control the aphids more. When planting at the beginning of the season, the seed material or suckers should be obtained from BBTV free areas of the world or from cultures that are grown and developed to be free of the virus. Currently, there is ongoing research into biopriming, or inducing systemic resistance by using bacteria that live inside the host but do not infect.

Control of banana bunchy top is achieved by killing the banana aphids then destroying all infected material. First, the aphids should be killed on the infected banana material, and then all the plant material should be destroyed to prevent the spread of the virus. Infected banana plants can be sprayed with an insecticide like Sevin to reduce or get rid of the aphid population, since control of viruses starts with control of the vectors. The agriculture department, however, recently obtained an EPA waiver for the pesticide Provado is a means of controlling the aphids that spread the disease.

== Importance ==
Banana bunchy top disease is the most serious virus disease of banana worldwide. Diseased plants rarely produce fruit and when they do, the fruit is stunted and twisted. However, in the rare scenario that a diseased plant does produce fruit that reaches maturity, it is edible. The banana bunchy top disease has had a huge impact on the banana industry in Hawaii and Australia and among other areas of the world. The disease was first seen on the Hawaiian island of Oahu in 1989 and by 2002, only 13 years later, it was a major disease on four of the Hawaiian islands (Hawaii, Oahu, Kauai and Maui). The movement of BBTD was mostly facilitated by human movement of diseased plant material and banana aphids from island to island. In the 1920s it almost completely destroyed the banana growing industry in Australia.

Island	Year	Month	City
Oahu	1989	July	Punaluu
Hawaii	1995	October	North Kona
Kauai	1997	September	Kilauea Town
Maui	2002	December	Pukalani

While BBTV certainly has a huge impact on the industrial scale of banana production, it can also be devastating to subsistence farmers who depend on their crop to feed their families and provide income. Small farmers will often lose the uphill battle of fighting against BBTV in their crop. Once established, it is very difficult to eradicate and manage the disease. The difficulty of eradication is perpetuated by a number of reasons. First of all, the disease is caused by a vector-transmitted virus and this virus is not completely understood yet. Secondly, all bananas are susceptible to the disease and no resistant varieties have been discovered or made commercially available. Lastly, the control methods are quite demanding, including chemical treatment for the aphid vectors, removal of all infected tissue (aka roguing), quarantining plants and monitoring alternate vector feeding sites.
