= Brisavirus =

Virus classification
- (unranked): Virus
- Realm: Monodnaviria
- Kingdom: Shotokuvirae
- Phylum: Cressdnaviricota
- Class: Arfiviricetes
- Order: Recrevirales
- Family: Redondoviridae
- Genus: Torbevirus
- Species: Torbevirus brisa

Species of virus

Brisavirus (isolate LC KY052047) is a species of viruses in the family Redondoviridae in the genus Torbevirus. Brisa- is from the Spanish word for "Breeze", which refers to their isolation from the human respiratory tract. It was discovered in a throat swab in a male traveler who presented with fever, enlarged adenoids, flushed skin and myalgia after testing negative for other viruses. Brisavirus like other viruses in the Redondoviridae family, are present and putatively replicate in the oro-respiratory tract. They are associated in patients with critical illness and periodontitis.

== Genome ==
Brisavirus has a CRESS DNA genome with 3 open reading frames that are inversely oriented that encode for the capsid and Replication-associated protein protein with a small and larger intergenic region. They replicate using rolling-circle replication like other CRESS viruses. By using metagenomic analysis, researchers found that the encoded proteins were most similar to porcine stool-associated circular virus 5 isolate CP33 (PoSCV5).
