= BBTV =

BBTV may refer to:

- BroadbandTV Corp
- Banana bunchy top virus
