= Chimpanzee stool associated circular virus =

Virus classification
- Group: Group II (ssDNA)

DNA virus isolated from chimpanzee stool

Chimpanzee stool associated circular virus is a single stranded DNA virus isolated from chimpanzee stool. This proposed species has not yet been accepted by the ICTV.

== Genome ==
The genome is ~2.6 kilobases in length and encodes two open reading frames (ORFs). The larger of the ORFs encodes the replicase gene and the other the putative capsid protein. A stem-loop and TATA boxes are present in the non coding parts of the sequence.

== Taxonomy ==
This virus appears to be related to the bovine stool associated circular virus, which is apparently a synonym of porcine stool-associated circular virus.

Chimpanzee stool associated circular virus appears to be an unclassified member species of ICTV-accepted genus Porprismacovirus (Smacoviridae), just like porcine stool-associated circular virus.
