= Abaca bract mosaic virus =

Virus classification
- (unranked): Virus
- Realm: Riboviria
- Kingdom: Orthornavirae
- Phylum: Pisuviricota
- Class: Stelpaviricetes
- Order: Patatavirales
- Family: Potyviridae
- Genus: Potyvirus (?)
- Virus: Abaca bract mosaic virus

Species of virus

Abaca bract mosaic virus (ABrMV) is a plant pathogenic virus. It is transmitted by Pentalonia nigronervosa, Aphis gossypii, and Rhopalosiphum maidis. The taxonomy is unknown, but it is thought to be a type of Potyvirus.

Attempts have been made to sequence ABrMV.

The virus is said to be a significant pathogen of the abaca, along with the Abaca bunchy top virus.

Banana bract mosaic virus also infects the abaca, but it is unknown whether the two viruses are related.
