= Rohanvirales =

Virus classification
- (unranked): Virus
- Realm: Monodnaviria
- Kingdom: Shotokuvirae
- Phylum: Cressdnaviricota
- Class: Arfiviricetes
- Order: Rohanvirales

Rohanvirales is an order of single-stranded DNA viruses in the class Arfiviricetes. The order was first described in 2022 by Mart Krupovic and Arvind Varsani, who also defined the order Rivendellvirales. The order is named after the fictional kingdom of Rohan in novels written by J. R. R. Tolkien.

== Taxonomy ==
The order contains the following families:

- Adamaviridae
- Kirkoviridae
- Nenyaviridae

== See also ==
- List of higher virus taxa
