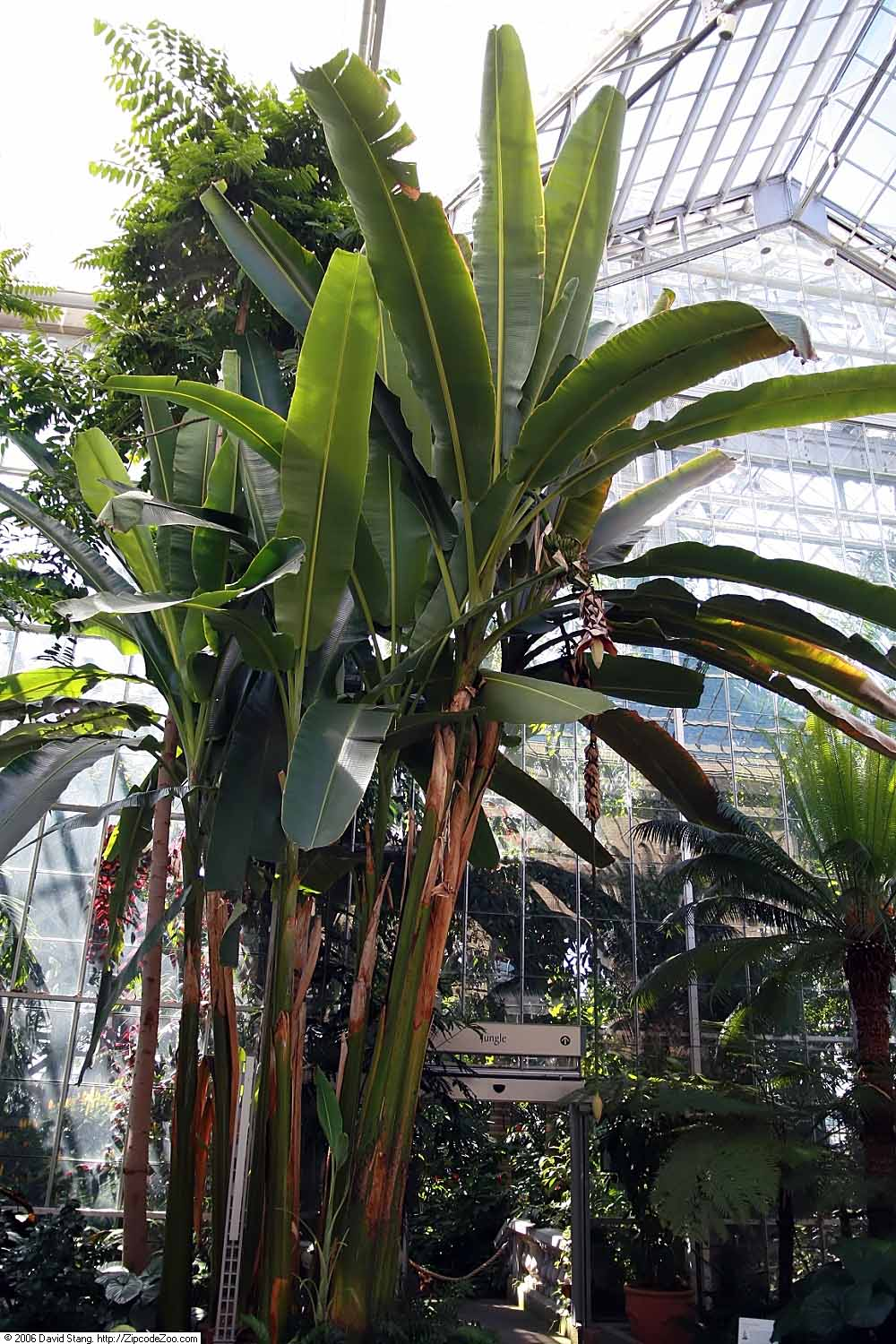
- At the United States Botanic Garden

Scientific classification
- Kingdom: Plantae
- Clade: Tracheophytes
- Clade: Angiosperms
- Clade: Monocots
- Clade: Commelinids
- Order: Zingiberales
- Family: Musaceae
- Genus: Musa
- Section: Musa sect. Callimusa
- Species: M. textilis

Binomial name
- Musa textilis Née

Synonyms
- List: Musa abaca Perr. nom. inval.; Musa amboinensis Miquel; Musa mindanaensis Miquel; Musa mindanensis Rump.; Musa silvéstris Colla; Musa tikap Warburg; Musa troglodytàrum textòria Blanco

= Abacá =

Abacá Musa textilis

Species of flowering plant

Abacá (/ɑːbəˈkɑː/ ah-bə-KAH; Filipino: abaka [ɐbɐˈka]), also known as Manila hemp, is a species of banana, Musa textilis, endemic to the Philippines. The plant grows to 13–22 feet (4.0–6.7 m) and has great economic importance, being harvested for its fiber extracted from the leaf-stems.

The lustrous fiber is traditionally hand-loomed into various indigenous textiles (abaca cloth or medriñaque) in the Philippines. They are still featured prominently as the traditional material of the barong tagalog, the national male attire of the Philippines, as well as in sheer lace-like fabrics called nipis used in various clothing components. Native abaca textiles also survive into the modern era among various ethnic groups, like the t'nalak of the T'boli people and the dagmay of the Bagobo people. Abaca is also used in traditional Philippine millinery, as well as for bags, shawls, and other decorative items. The hatmaking straw made from Manila hemp is called tagal or tagal straw.

The fiber is also exceptionally strong, stronger than hemp and naturally salt-resistant, making it ideal for making twines and ropes (especially for maritime shipping). It became a major trade commodity in the colonial era for this reason. The abaca industry declined sharply in the mid-20th century when abaca plantations were decimated by World War II and plant diseases, as well as the invention of nylon in the 1930s. Today, abaca is mostly used in a variety of specialized paper products including tea bags, filter paper and banknotes. Manila envelopes and Manila paper derive their name from this fiber.

Abaca is classified as a hard fiber, along with coir, henequin and sisal. Abaca is grown as a commercial crop in the Philippines, Ecuador, and Costa Rica.

== Description ==
The abacá plant is stoloniferous, meaning that the plant produces runners or shoots along the ground that then root at each segment. Cutting and transplanting rooted runners is the primary technique for creating new plants, since seed growth is substantially slower. (Note: A plant grown from a shoot takes three years to maturity; while a plant grown from a seed takes four years to maturity.) Abacá has a "false trunk" or pseudostem about 6–15 inches (15–38 cm) in diameter. The leaf stalks (petioles) are expanded at the base to form sheaths that are tightly wrapped together to form the pseudostem. There are from 12 to 25 leaves, dark green on the top and pale green on the underside, sometimes with large brown patches. They are oblong in shape with a deltoid base. They grow in succession. The petioles grow to at least 1 foot (30 cm) in length.

When the plant is mature, the flower stalk grows up inside the pseudostem. The male flower has five petals, each about 1.5 inches (3.8 cm) long. The leaf sheaths contain the valuable fiber. After harvesting, the coarse fibers range in length from 6–12 feet (180–370 cm) long. They are composed primarily of cellulose, lignin, and pectin.

The fruit, which is inedible and is rarely seen as harvesting occurs before the plant fruits, grows to about 2–3 inches (5.1–7.6 cm) in length and 1 inch (2.5 cm) in diameter. It has black turbinate seeds that are 0.167 inches (0.42 cm) in diameter.

== Systematics ==
The abacá plant belongs to the banana family, Musaceae; it resembles the closely related wild seeded bananas, Musa acuminata and Musa balbisiana. Its scientific name is Musa textilis. Within the genus Musa, it is placed in section Callimusa (now including the former section Australimusa), members of which have a diploid chromosome number of 2n = 20.

== Genetic diversity ==
The Philippines, especially the Bicol region in Luzon, has the most abaca genotypes and cultivars. Genetic analysis using simple sequence repeats (SSR) markers revealed that the Philippines' abaca germplasm is genetically diverse. Abaca genotypes in Luzon had higher genetic diversity than Visayas and Mindanao. Ninety-five (95) percent was attributed to molecular variance within the population, and only 5% of the molecular variance to variation among populations. Genetic analysis by Unweighted Pair Group Method with Arithmetic Mean (UPGMA) revealed several clusters irrespective of geographical origin.

== History ==
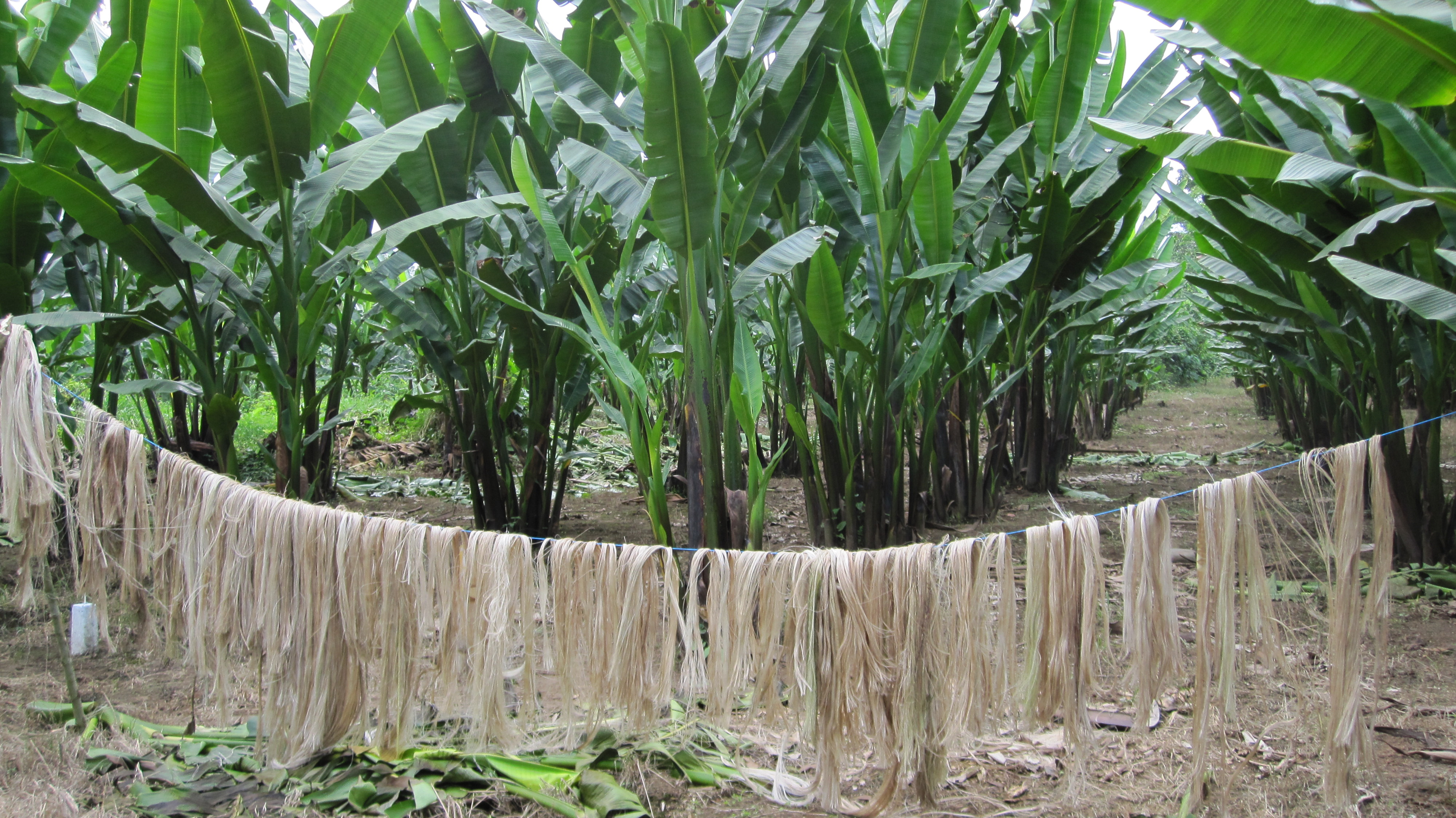
Abacá fiber drying in abaca farm, Costa Rica

Before synthetic textiles came into use, M. textilis was a major source of high quality fiber: soft, silky and fine. Ancestors of the modern abacá are thought to have originated from the eastern Philippines, where there is significant rainfall throughout the year. Wild varieties of abacá can still be found in the interior forests of the island province of Catanduanes, away from cultivated areas.

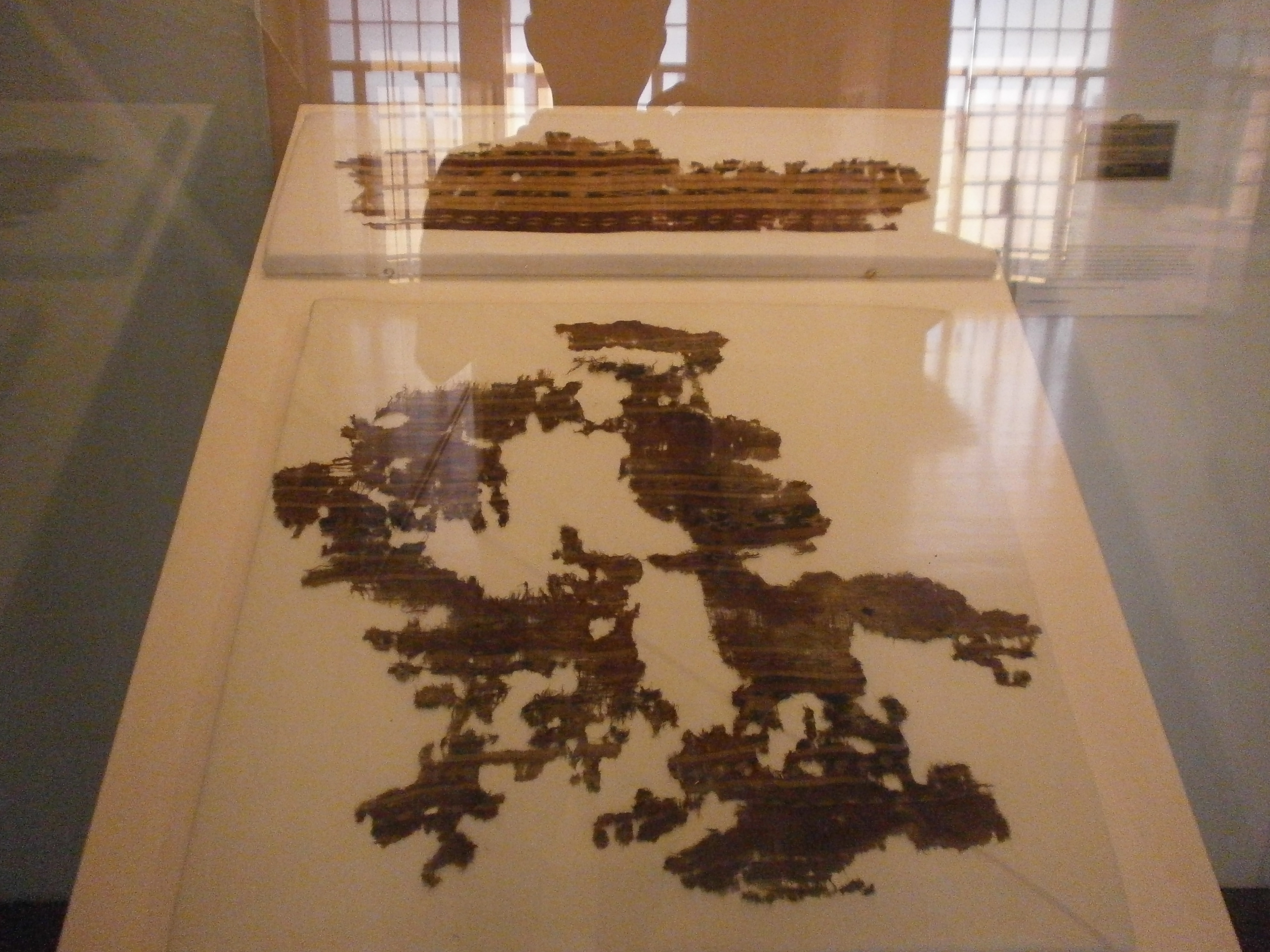
The Banton Burial Cloth (c. 1200–1400 AD), the oldest existing example of warp ikat in Southeast Asia at the National Museum of the Philippines). The cloth was found in the sacred Ipot cave of the island of Banton in Romblon. It is made from abacá.

Today, Catanduanes has many other modern kinds of abacá which are more competitive. For many years, breeders from various research institutions have made the cultivated varieties of Catanduanes even more competitive in local and international markets. This results in the optimum production of the island which had a consistent highest production throughout the archipelago.

=== 16th century ===
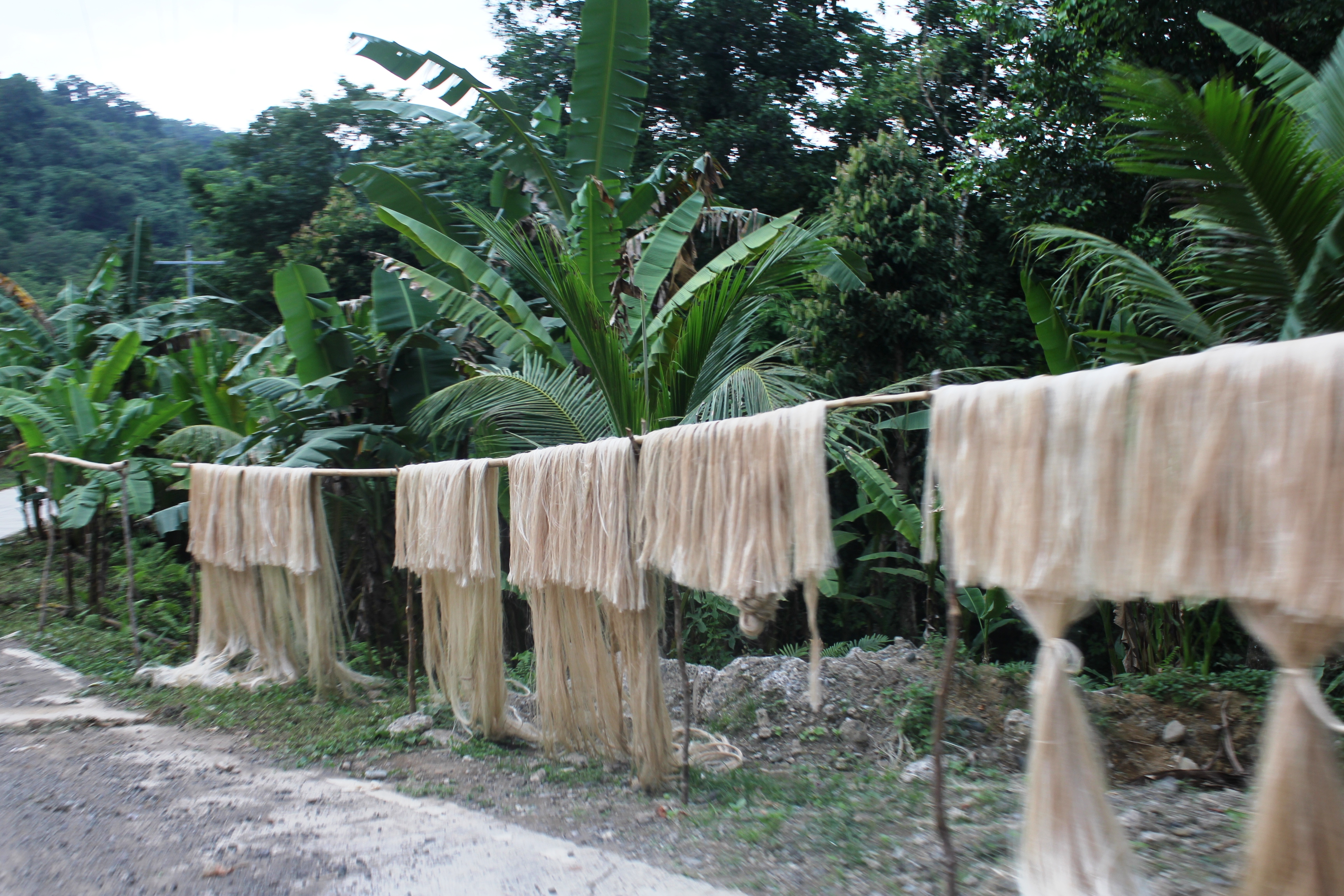
Abacá Fiber in Lagonoy, Camarines Sur, Philippines

Europeans first came into contact with Abacá fibre when Ferdinand Magellan landed in the Philippines in 1521, as the natives were already cultivating it and utilizing it in bulk for textiles. Throughout the Spanish colonial era, it was referred to as "medriñaque" cloth.

=== 19th century ===
By 1897, the Philippines were exporting almost 100,000 tons of abacá, and it was one of the three biggest cash crops, along with tobacco and sugar. In fact, from 1850 through the end of the 19th century, sugar or abacá alternated with each other as the biggest export crop of the Philippines. This 19th-century trade was predominantly with the United States and the making of ropes was done mainly in New England, although in time rope-making shifted back to the Philippines.

From 1898 to 1946, the United States colonized the Philippines following the Spanish–American War. The Guggenheim claims the "colonial government found ways to prevent Filipinos from profiting off of the abaca crops, instead favoring the businesses of American expats and Japanese immigrants, as well as ensuring that the bulk of the abaca harvests were exported to the United States" for use in military initiatives.

=== 20th century ===
In the early 1900s, a train running from Danao to Argao would transport Philippine abacá from the plantations to Cebu City for export. The railway system was destroyed during World War II; the abaca continues to be transported to Cebu by road.

Outside the Philippines, abacá was first cultivated on a large scale in Sumatra in 1925 under the Dutch, who had observed its cultivation in the Philippines for cordage since the nineteenth century, followed up by plantings in Central America in 1929 sponsored by the U.S. Department of Agriculture. It also was transplanted into India and Guam. Commercial planting began in 1930 in British North Borneo; at the onset of World War II, the supply from the Philippines was eliminated by the Empire of Japan.

After the war, the U.S. Department of Agriculture started production in Panama, Costa Rica, Honduras, and Guatemala.

=== 21st century ===
Today, abacá is produced primarily in the Philippines and Ecuador. The Philippines produces between 85% and 95% of the world's abacá, and the production employs 1.5 million people. Production has declined because of virus diseases.

== Cultivation ==
The plant is normally grown in well-drained loamy soil, using rhizomes planted at the start of the rainy season. In addition, new plants can be started by seeds. Growers harvest abacá fields every three to eight months after an initial growth period of 12–25 months. Harvesting is done by removing the leaf-stems after flowering but before the fruit appears. The plant loses productivity between 15 and 40 years. The slopes of volcanoes provide a preferred growing environment. Harvesting generally includes several operations involving the leaf sheaths:

- tuxying (separation of primary and secondary sheath)
- stripping (getting the fibers)
- drying (usually following the tradition of sun-drying).

When the processing is complete, the bundles of fiber are pale and lustrous with a length of 6–12 feet (1.8–3.7 m).

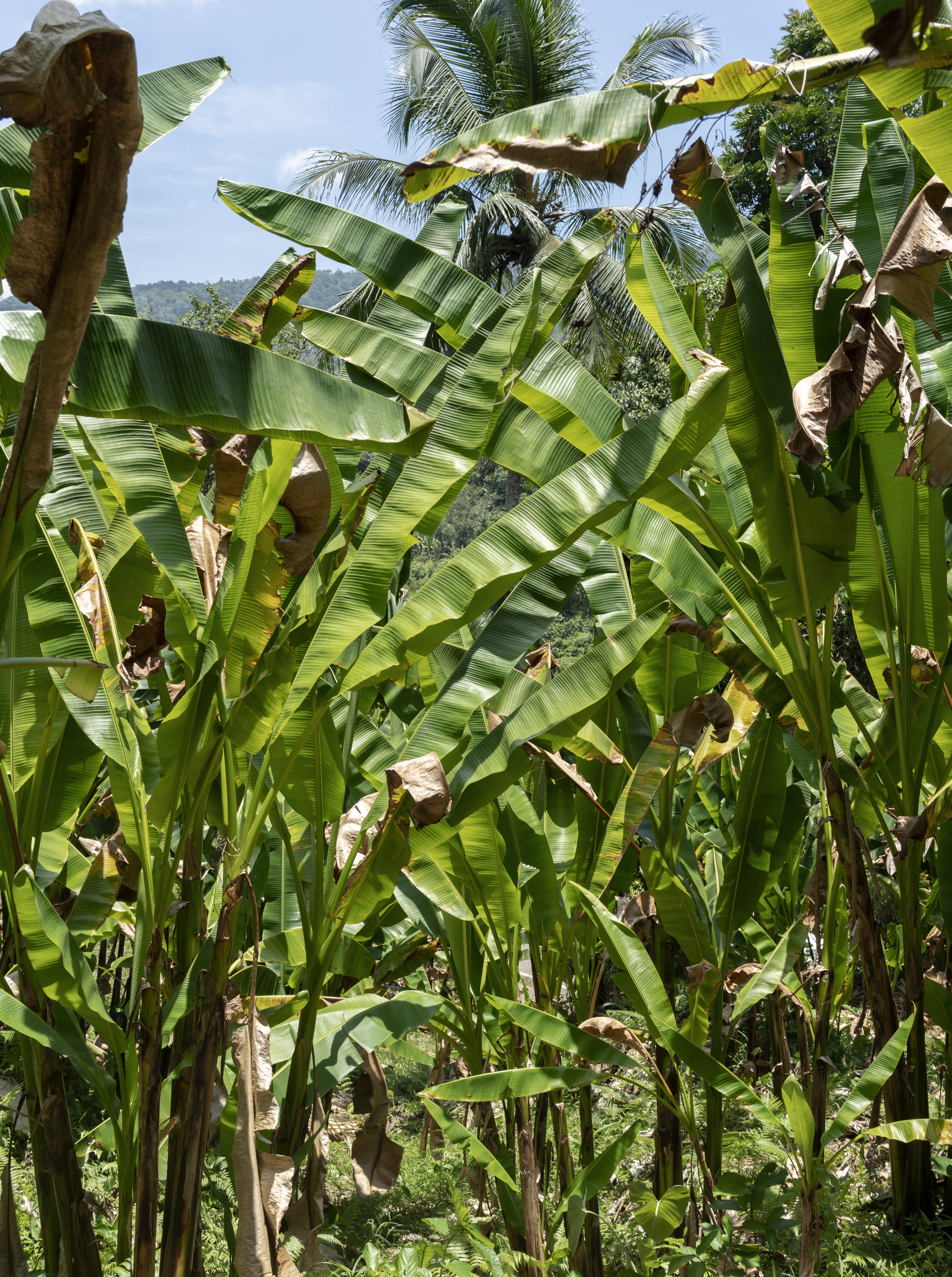
1. Abacá plants have several stalks which can be harvested annually and regenerate fully within a year.

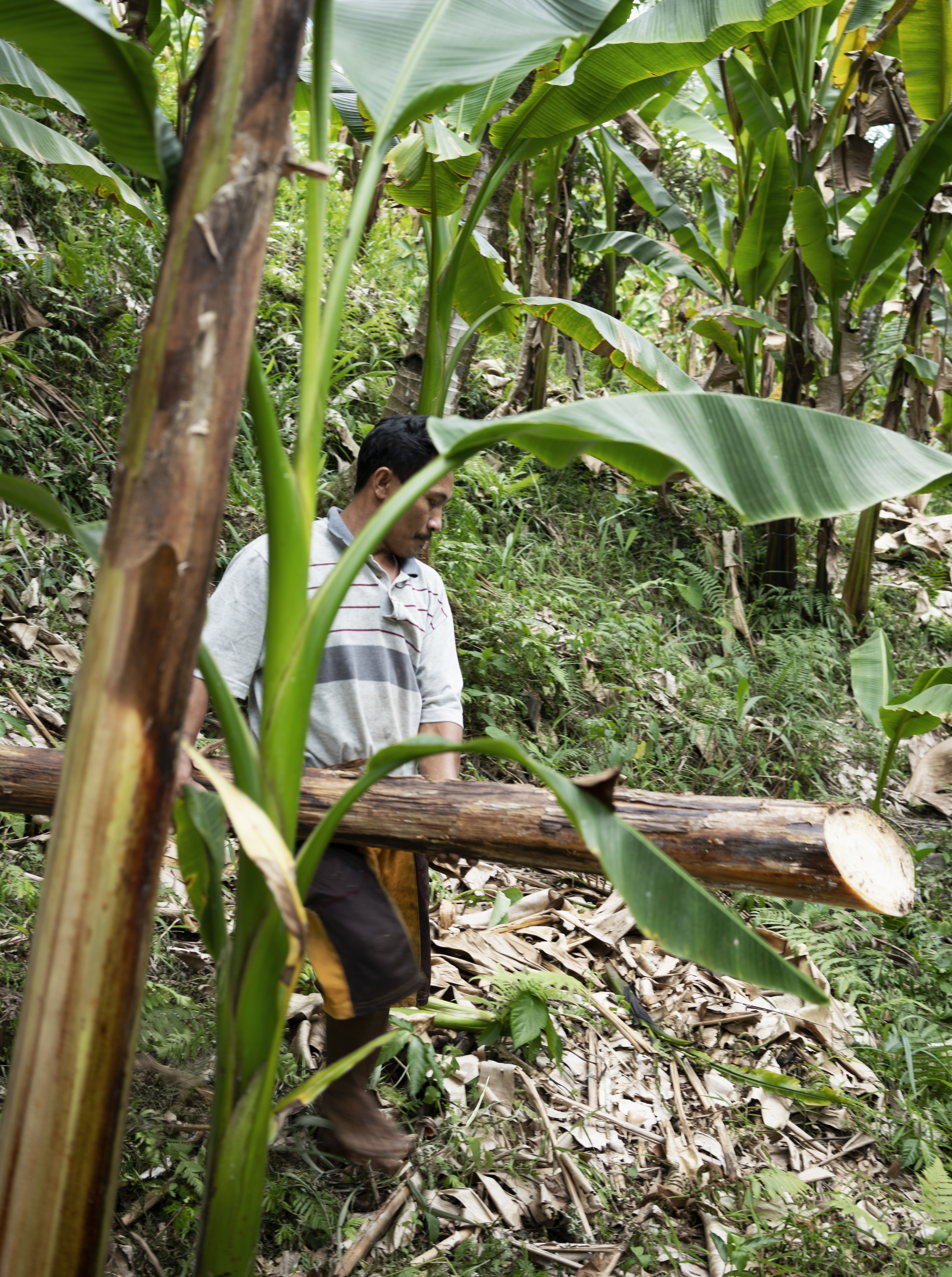
2. Abacá plants are harvested by "topping", cutting the leaves with a bamboo sickle, cutting or "tumbling" the stalks. The leaves are compost on the ground, creating a fertiliser.

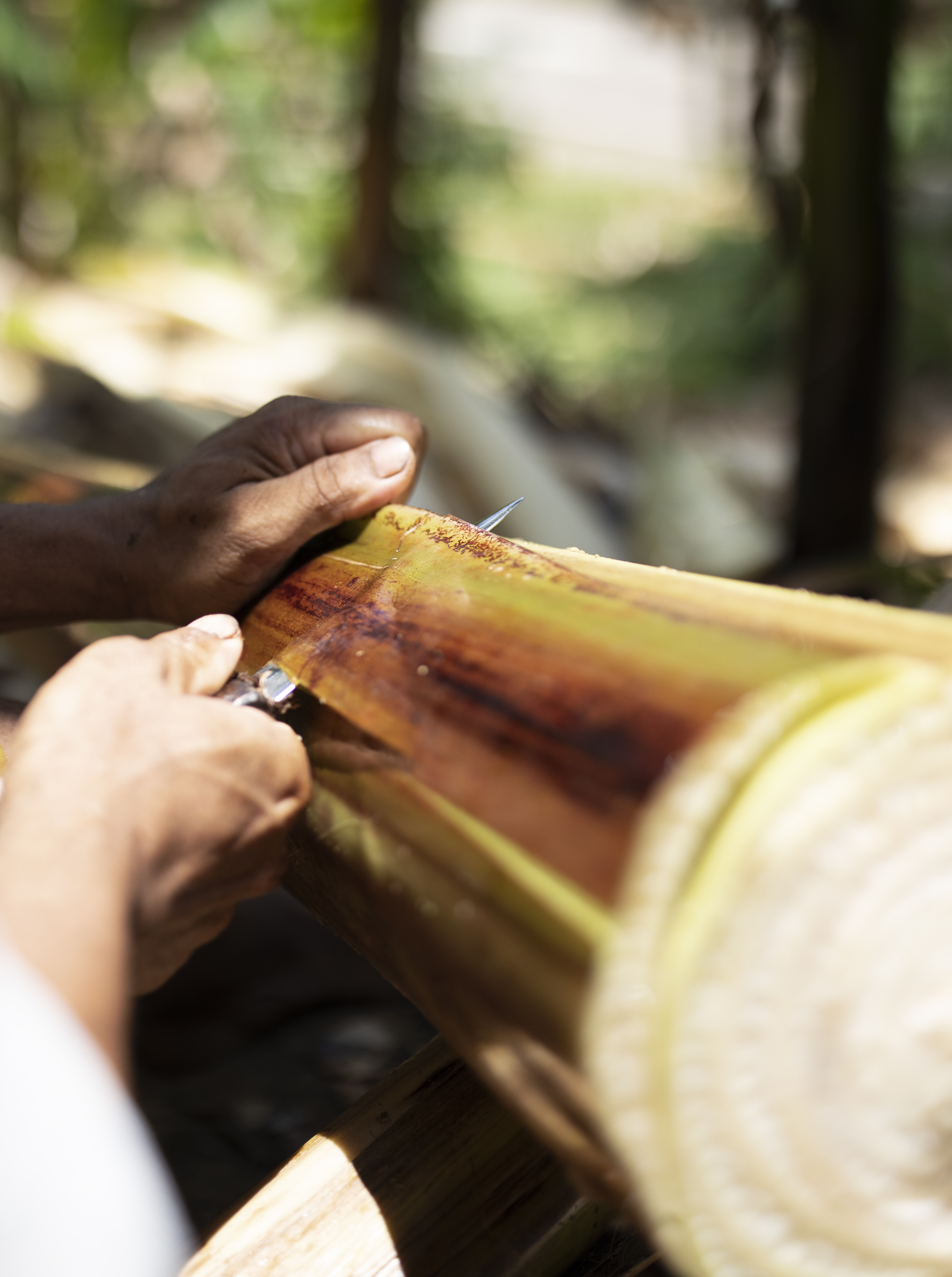
3. The tuxy, the outer layer of the leaf sheath contains primary fibres is separated from the inner layers.

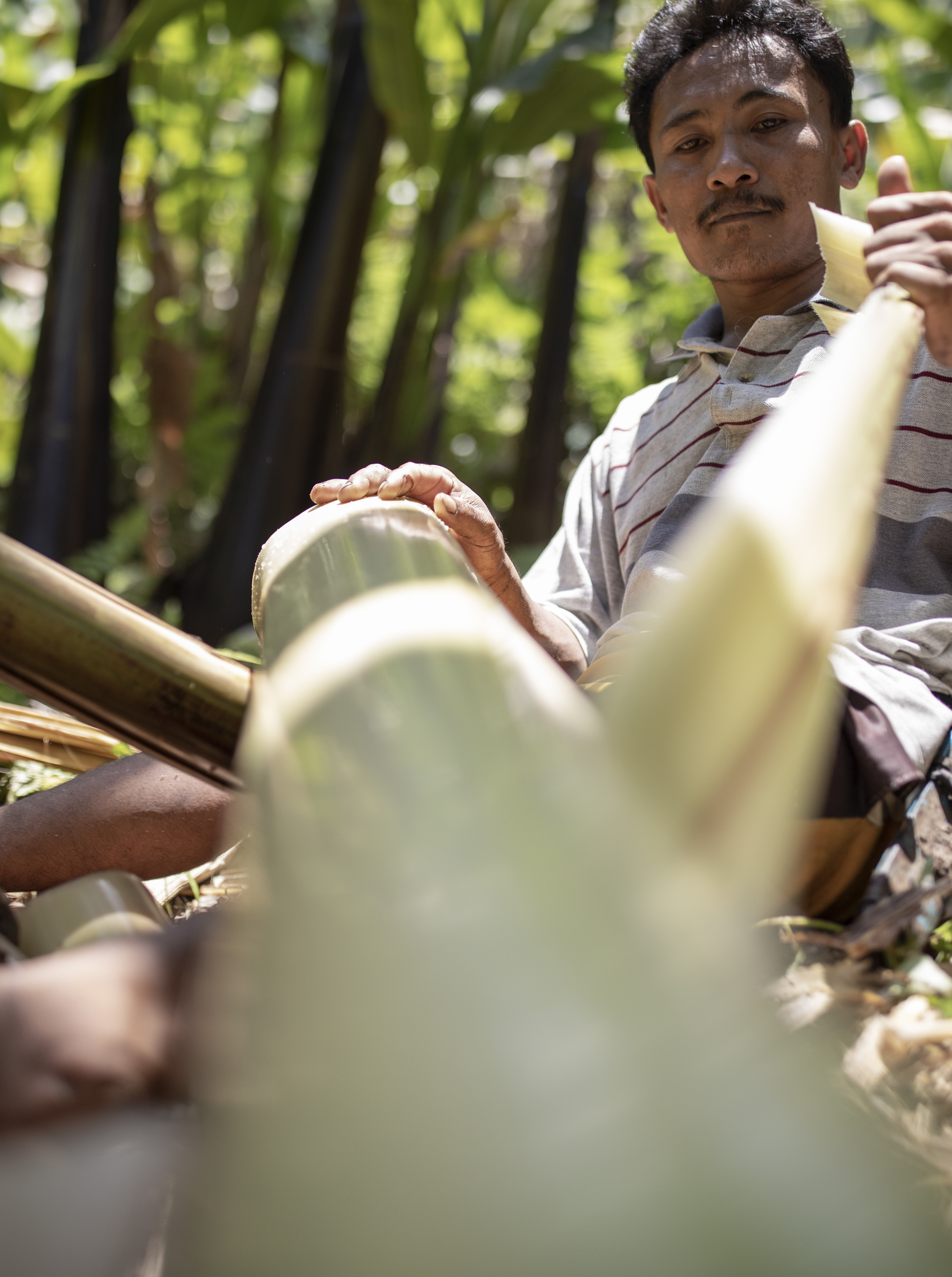
4. The inner layers contain the secondary fibres and pulpy material.

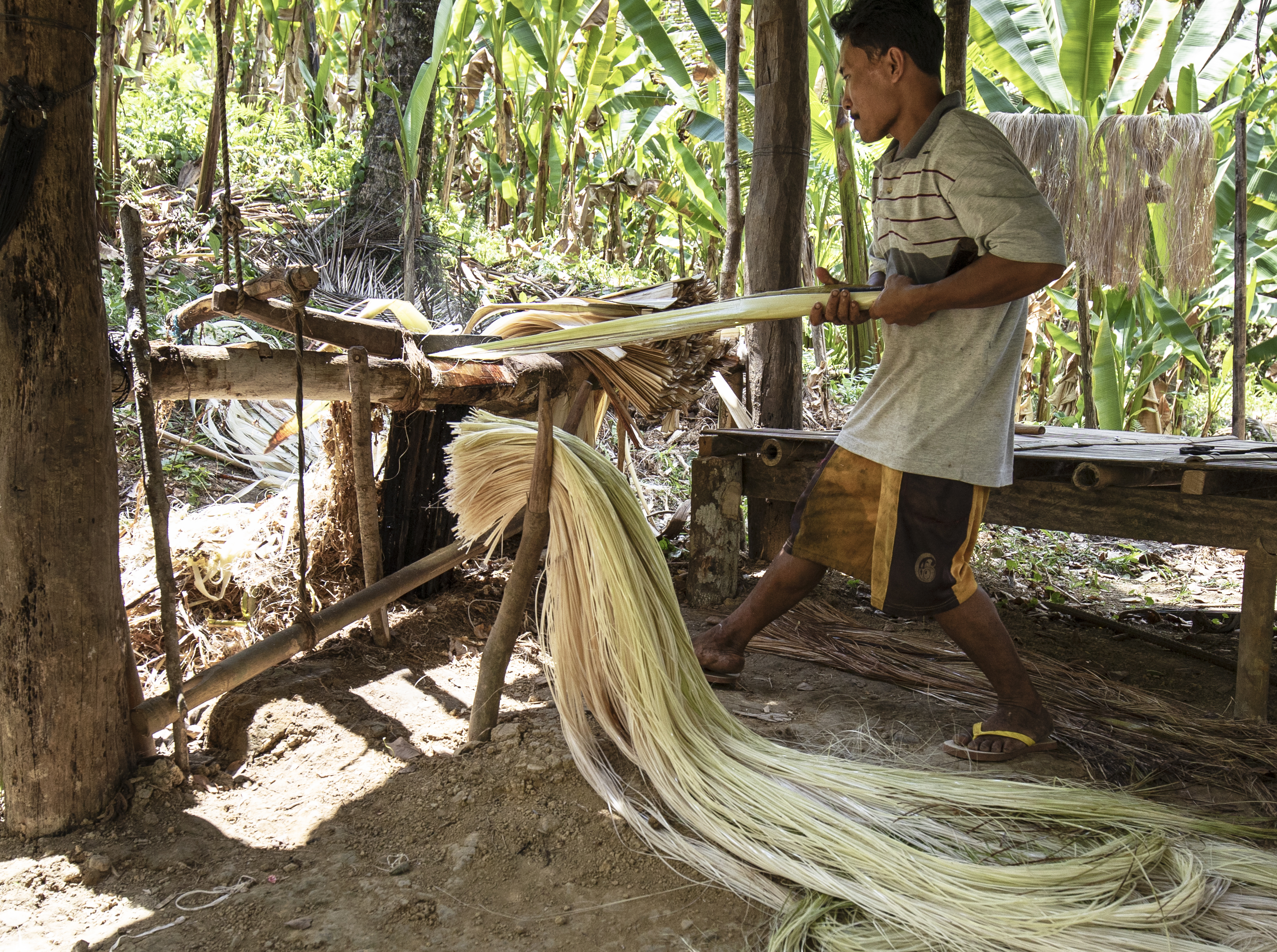
5.The tuxies are separated by hand using a stripping knife at the harvesting site.

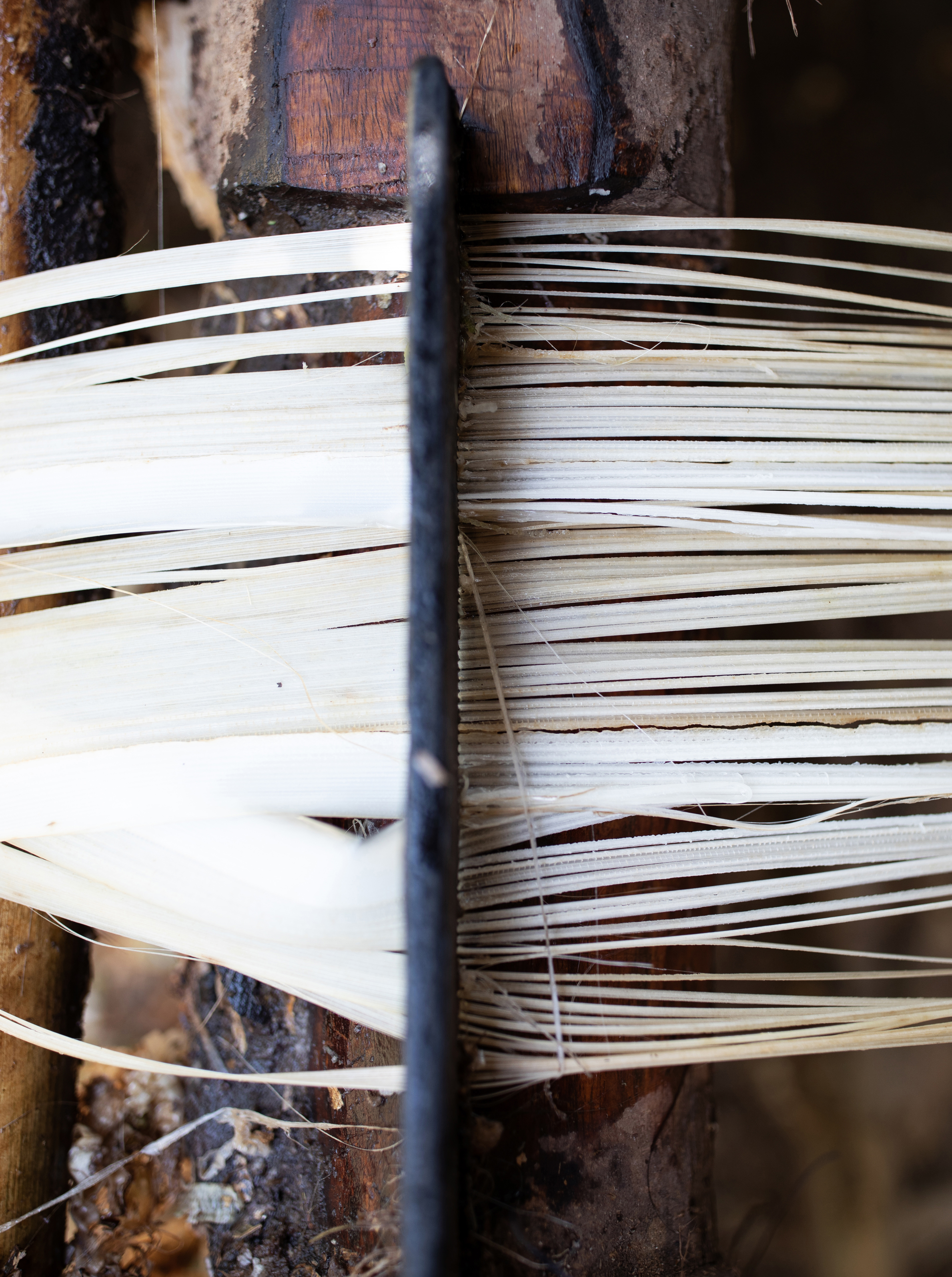
6. The fibres are then "combed" to separate them.

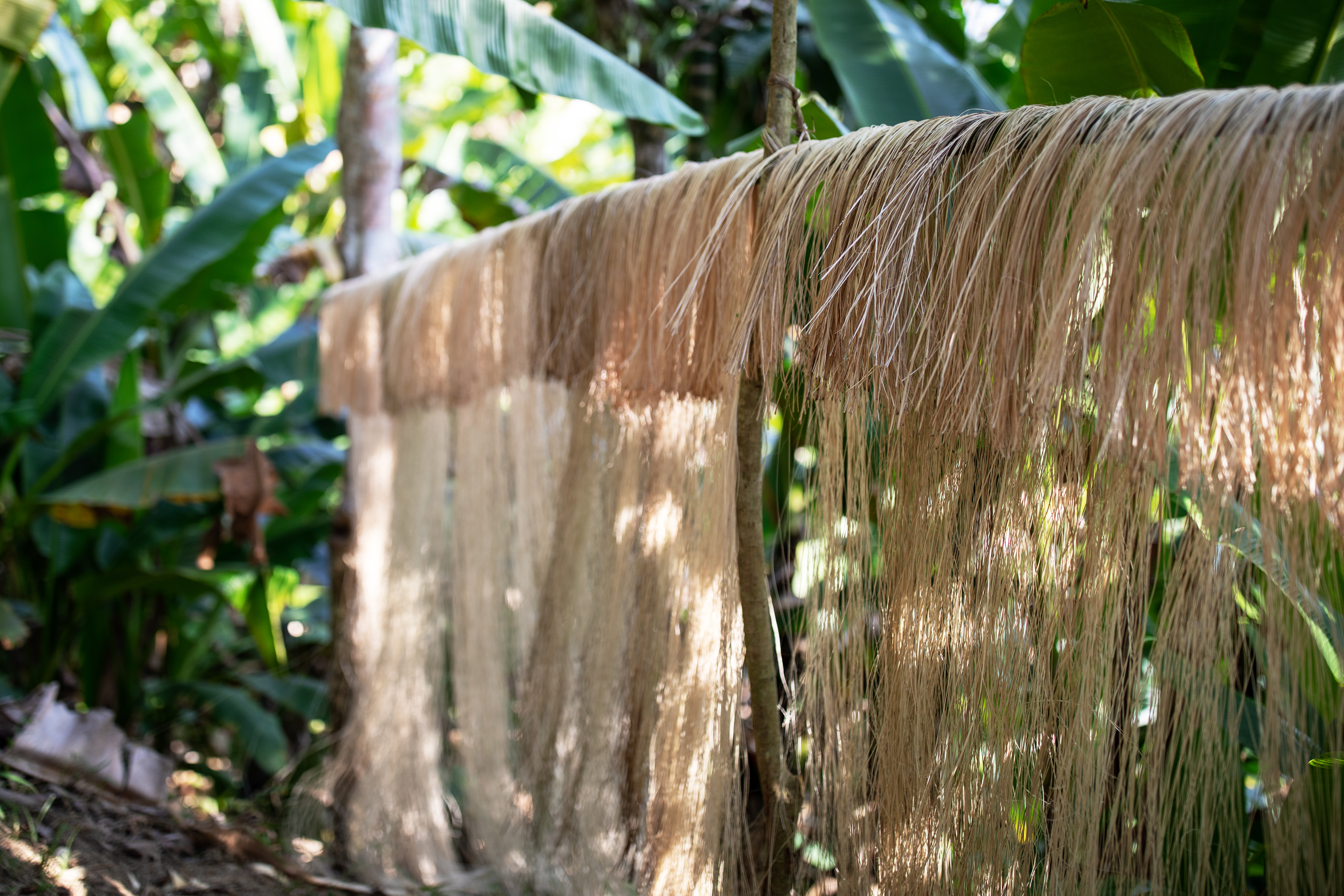
7. The fibres are then air-dried and bundled together before being transported from forest to the trading warehouse of the farmers cooperative.

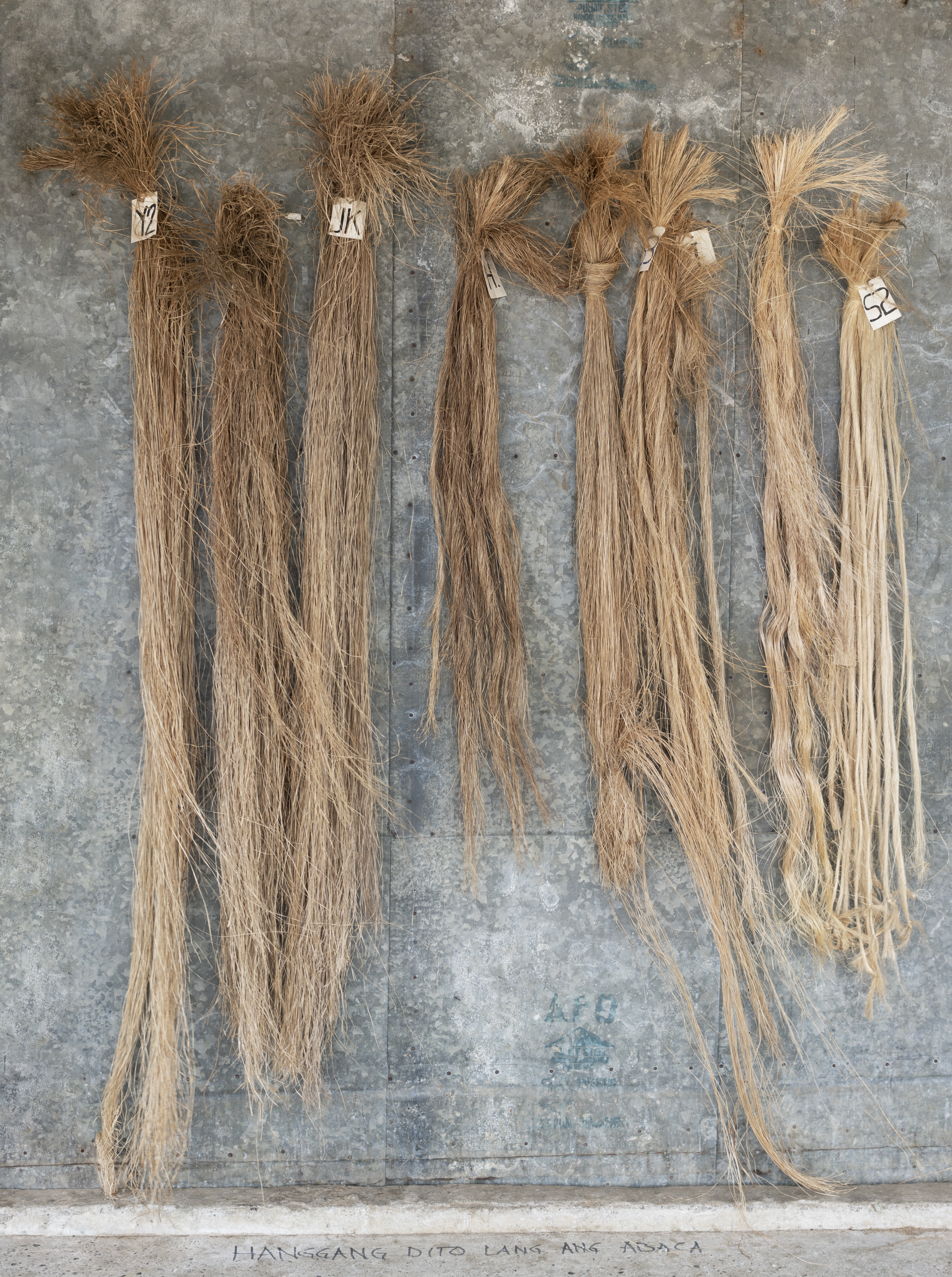
8. There they are sorted by colour grades, with lighter coloured fibres being more expensive due to their rarity.

In Costa Rica, more modern harvest and drying techniques are being developed to accommodate the very high yields obtained there.

According to the Philippine Fiber Industry Development Authority, the Philippines provided 87.4% of the world's abacá in 2014, earning the Philippines US$111.33 million. The demand is still greater than the supply. The remainder came from Ecuador (12.5%) and Costa Rica (0.1%). The Bicol region in the Philippines produced 27,885 metric tons of abacá in 2014, the largest of any Philippine region.

The Philippine Rural Development Program (PRDP) and the Department of Agriculture reported that in 2009–2013, Bicol Region had a 39% share of Philippine abacá production of which an overwhelming 92% came from Catanduanes Island. Eastern Visayas, the second largest producer had 24% and the Davao Region, the third largest producer had 11% of the total production. Around 42 percent of the total abacá fiber shipments from the Philippines went to the United Kingdom in 2014, making it the top importer. Germany imported 37.1 percent abacá pulp from the Philippines, importing around 7,755 metric tons (MT). Sales of abacá cordage surged 20 percent in 2014 to a total of 5,093 MT from 4,240 MT, with the United States holding around 68 percent of the market.

=== Pathogens ===
Abacá is vulnerable to a number of pathogens, notably abaca bunchy top virus, abaca bract mosaic virus, and abaca mosaic virus.

== Uses ==
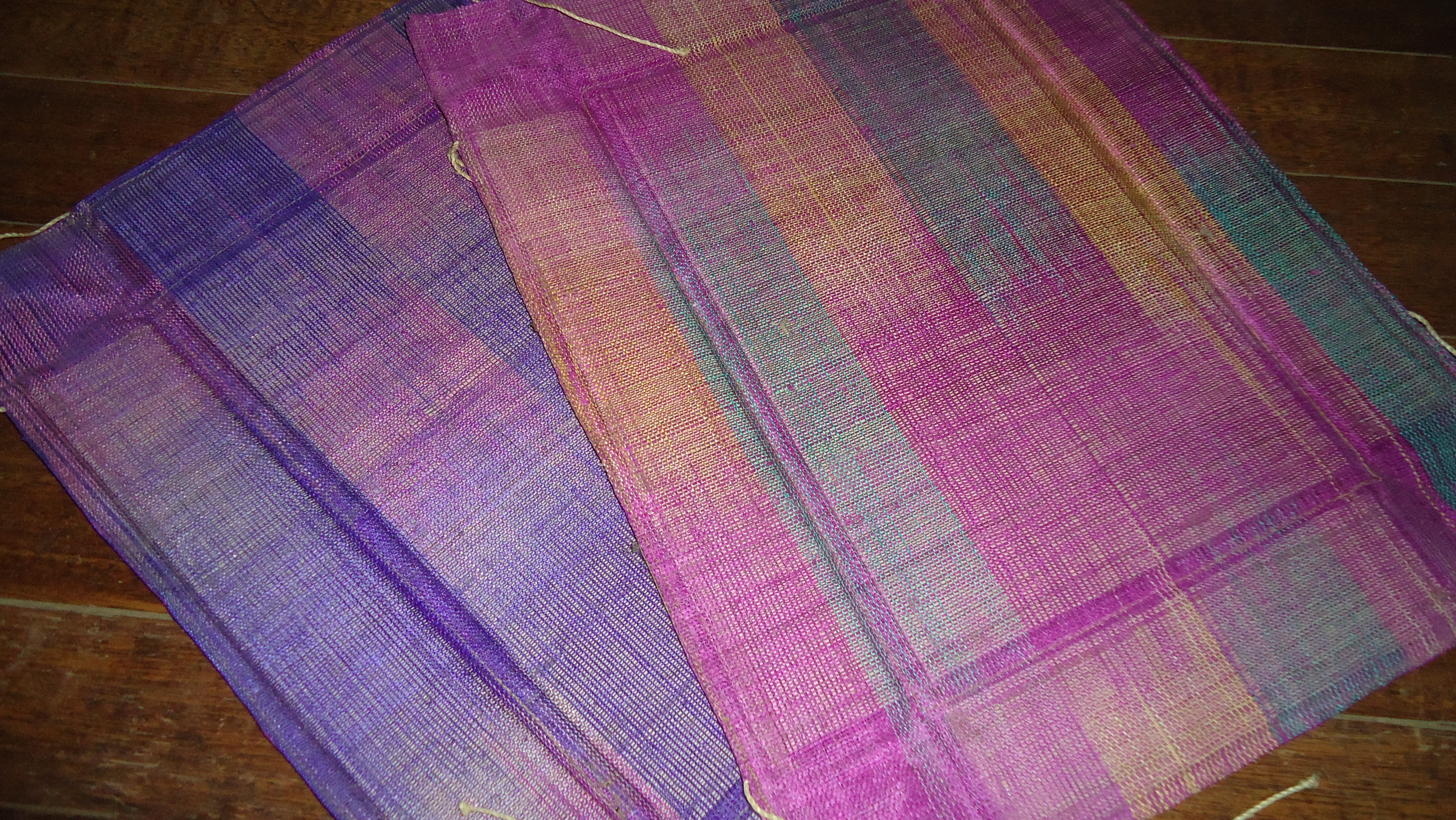
Mats made from woven abacá fibers from the Philippines

Due to its strength, it is a sought after product and is the strongest of the natural fibers. It is used by the paper industry for such specialty uses such as tea bags, banknotes and decorative papers. It can be used to make handcrafts such as hats, bags, carpets, clothing and furniture.

Lupis is the finest quality of abacá. Sinamay is woven chiefly from abacá.

=== Textiles ===
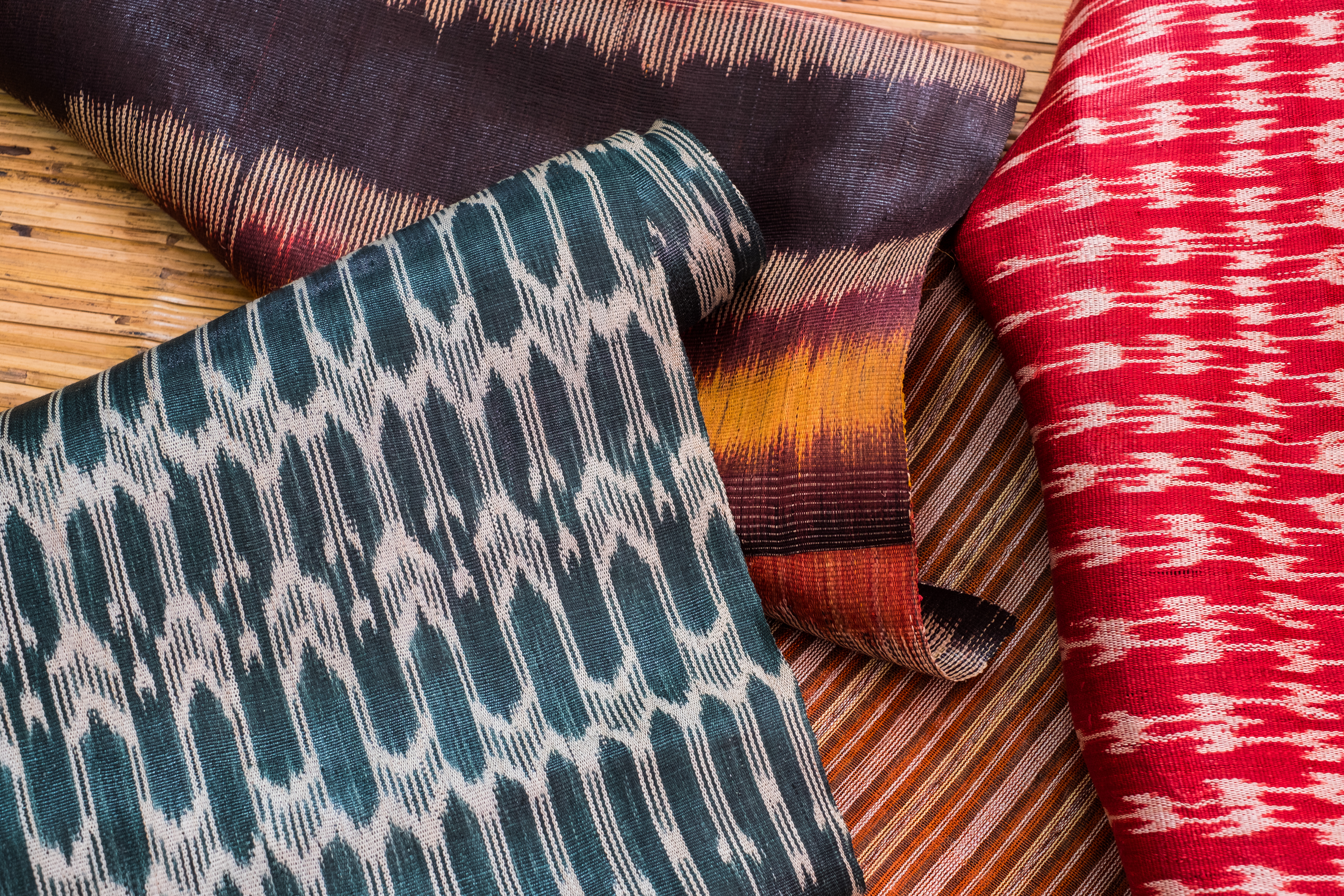
The traditional t'nalak cloth of the T'boli dreamweavers are made from abacá fibers

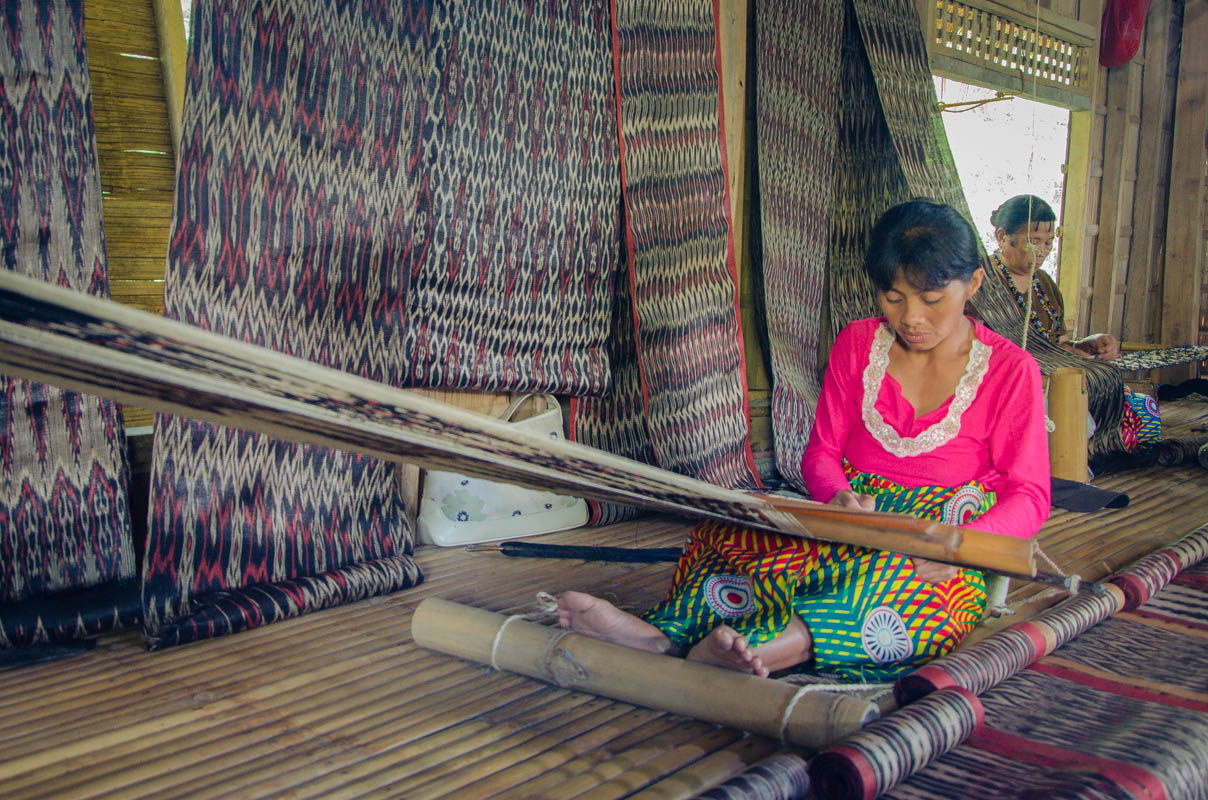
A T'boli dreamweaver using a traditional loom

Abacá fibers were traditionally woven into sturdy textiles and clothing in the Philippines since pre-colonial times. Along with cotton, they were the main source of textile fibers used for clothing in the pre-colonial Philippines. Abacá cloth was often compared to calico in terms of texture and was a major trade commodity in the pre-colonial maritime trade and the Spanish colonial era. There are multiple traditional types and names of abaca cloth among the different ethnic groups of the Philippines. Undyed plain abacá cloth, woven from fine fibers of abaca, is generally known as sinamáy in most of the islands. Abacá cloth with a more delicate texture is called tinampipi. While especially fine lace-like abacá cloth is called nipis or lupis. Fine abacá fibers may also be woven with piña, silk, or fine cotton to create a fabric called jusi.

Traditional abacá textiles were often dyed in various colors from various natural dyes. These include blue from indigo (tarum, dagum, tayum, etc.); black from ebony (knalum or batulinao) leaves; red from noni roots and sapang; yellow from turmeric (kalawag, kuning, etc.); and so on. They were often woven into specific patterns, and further ornamented with embroidery, beadwork, and other decorations. Most clothing made from abacá took the form of the baro (also barú or bayú, literally "shirt" or "clothing"), a simple collar-less shirt or jacket with close-fitting long sleeves worn by both men and women in most ethnic groups in the pre-colonial Philippines. These were paired with wraparound sarong-like skirts (for both men and women), close-fitting pants, or loincloths (bahag).

During the Spanish colonial era, abacá cloth became known as medriñaque in Spanish (apparently derived from a native Cebuano name). They were exported to other Spanish colonies since the 16th century. A waistcoat of a native Quechua man in Peru was recorded as being made of medriñaque as early as 1584. Abacá cloth also appear in English records, spelled variously as medrinacks, medrianacks, medrianackes, and medrinacles, among other names. They were used as canvas for sails and for stiffening clothing like skirts, collars, and doublets.

Philippine indigenous tribes still weave abacá-based textiles like t'nalak, made by the Tiboli tribe of South Cotabato, and dagmay, made by the Bagobo people. Abacá cloth is found in museum collections around the world, like the Boston Museum of Fine Arts and the Textile Museum of Canada.

The inner fibers are also used in the making of hats, including the "Manila hats", slippers, hammocks, matting, cordage, ropes, coarse twines, and types of canvas.

=== Industrial textile production ===
==== Processing ====
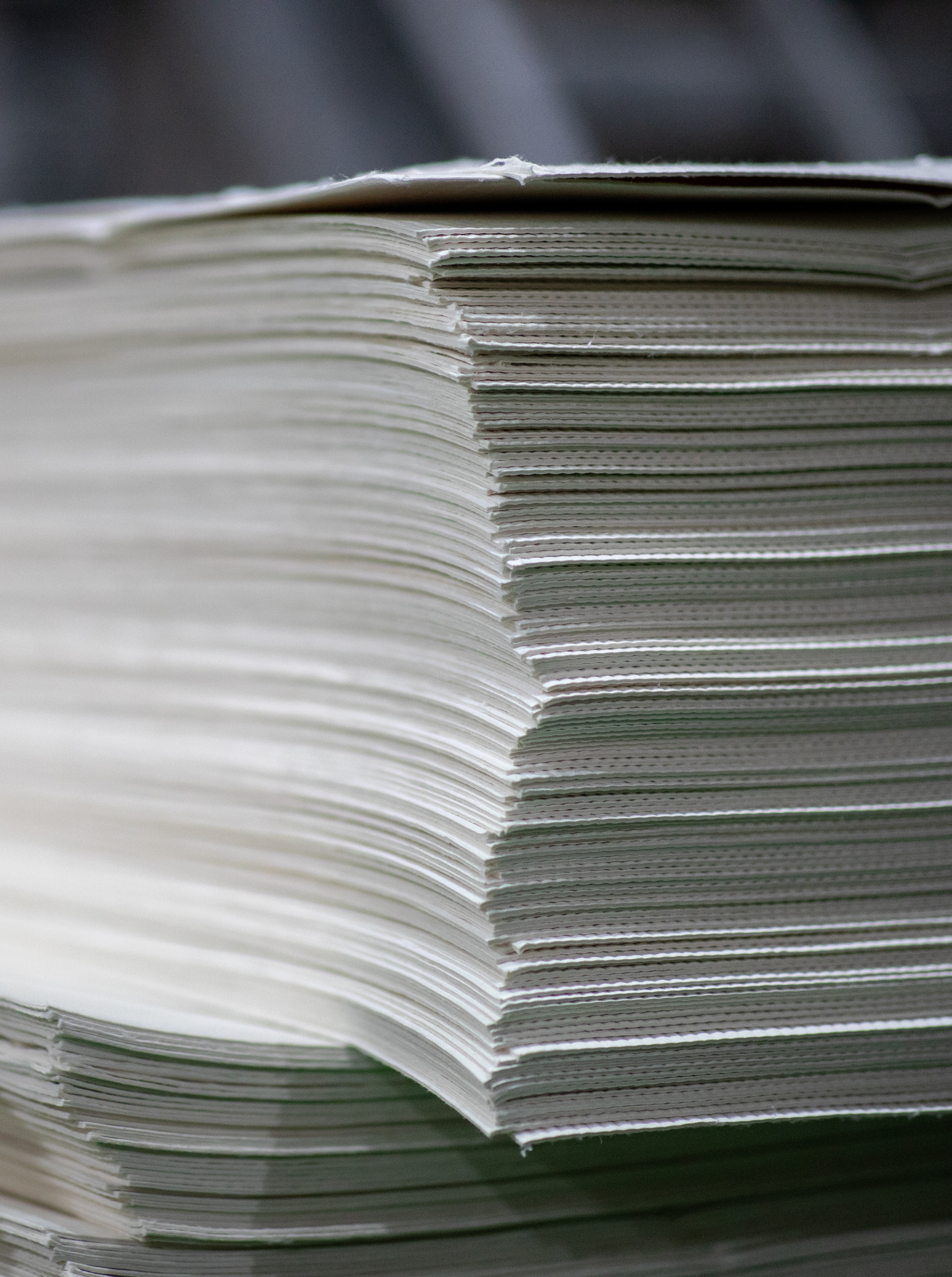
1. The raw fibres are tied with rope and shipped to a factory, where they are boiled and pressed into cardboard like sheets.

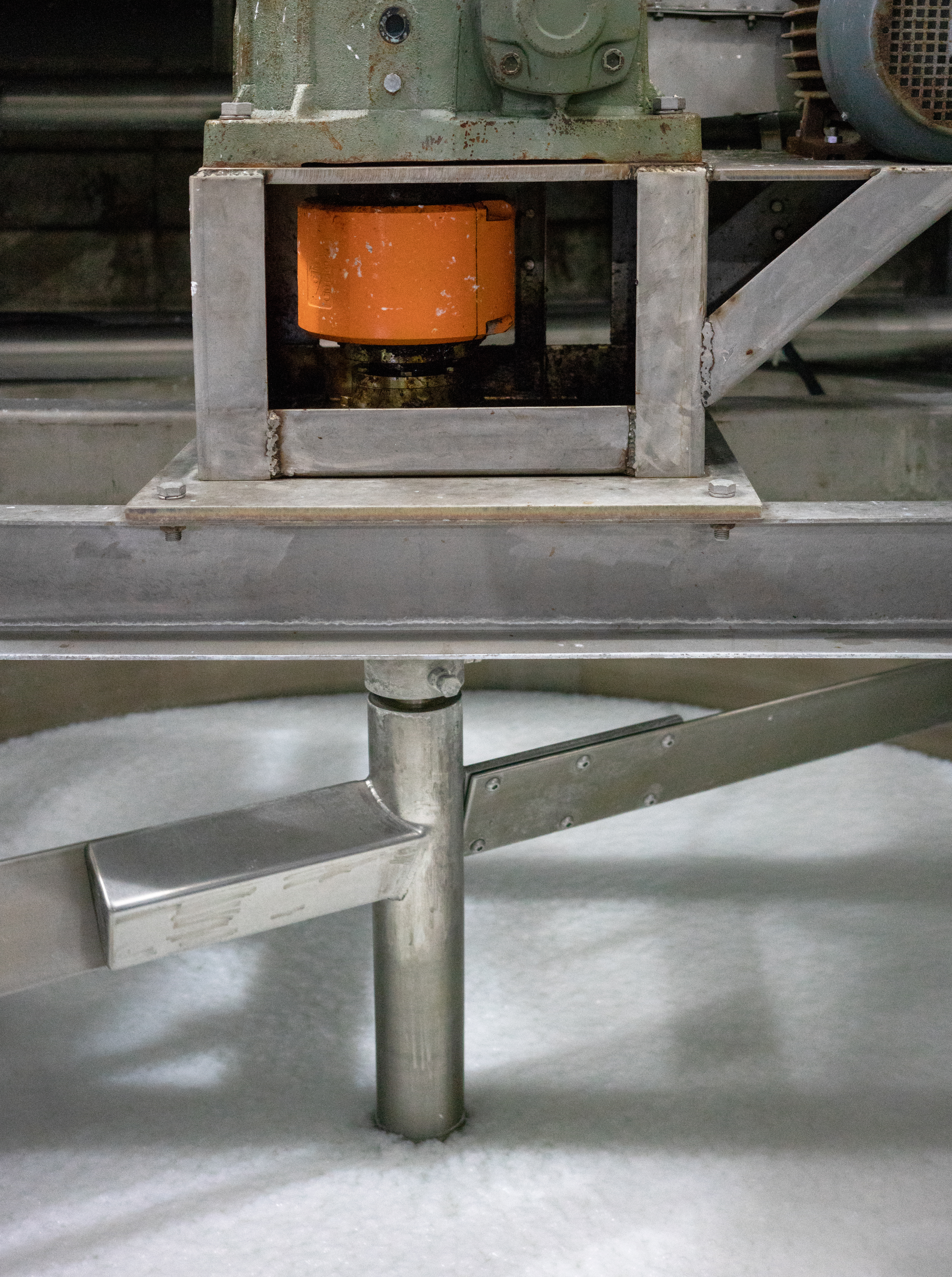
2. The abacá fibre sheets are then soaked in water.

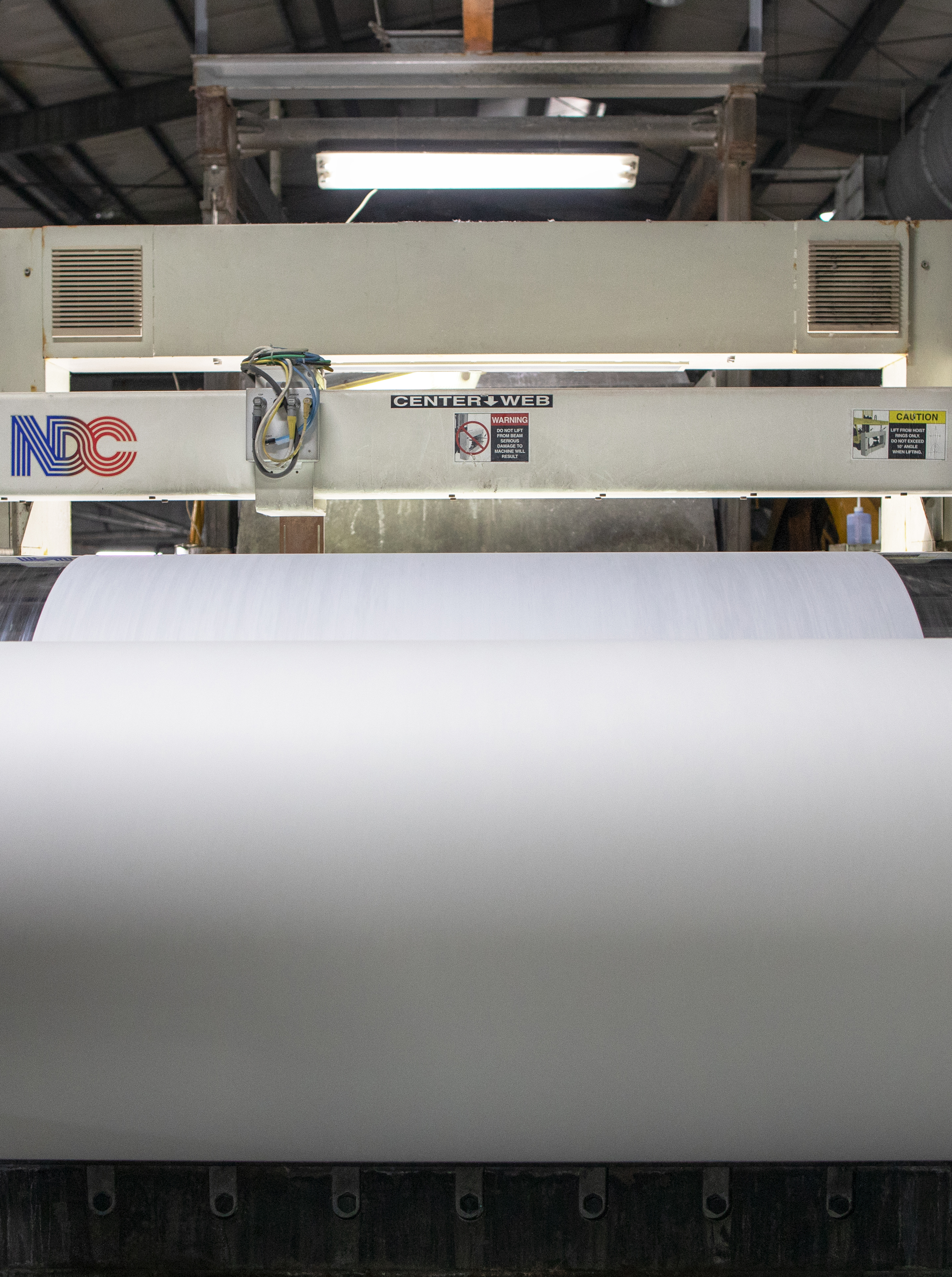
3. They are then made into paper which are then cut into strips.

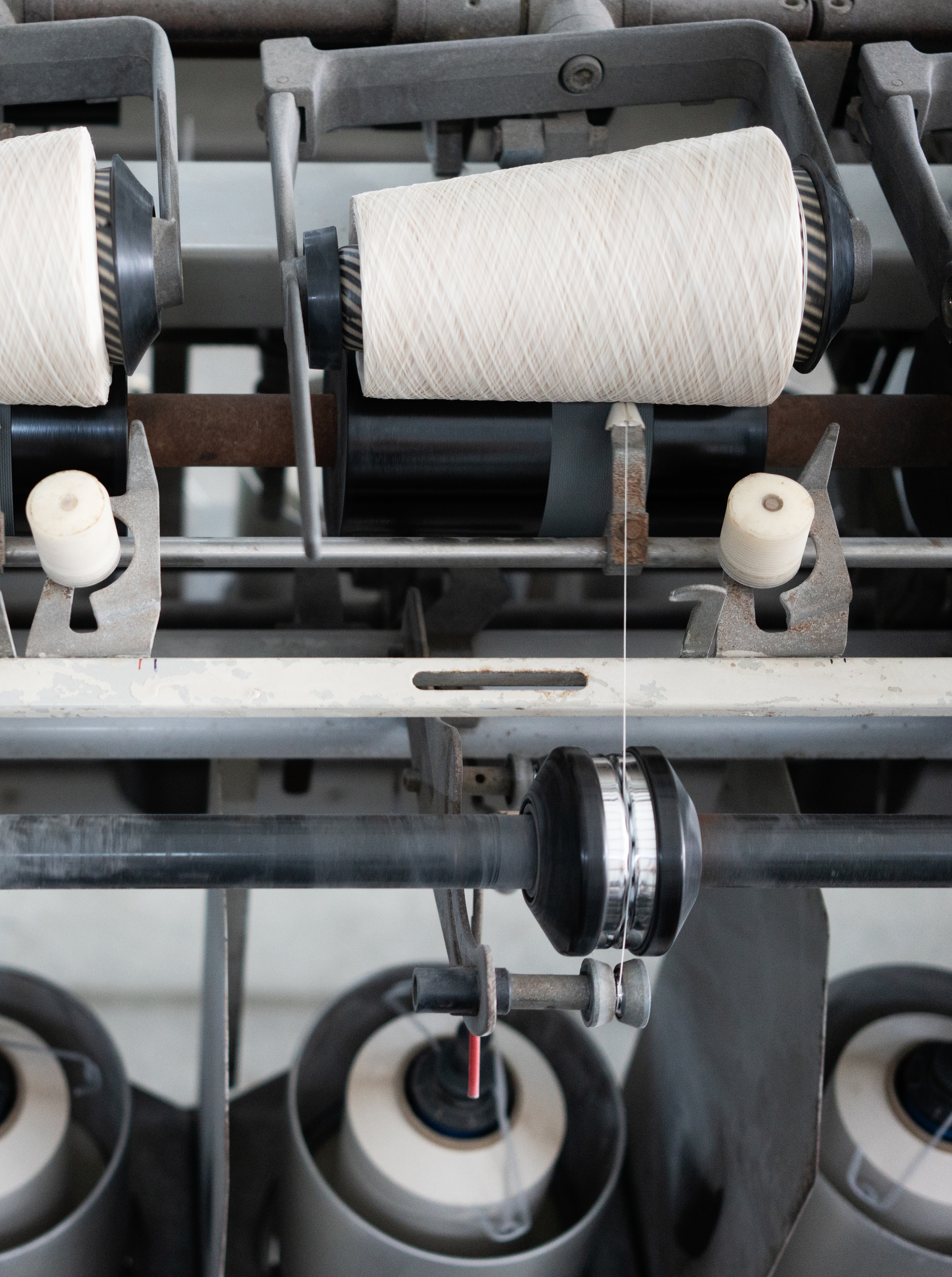
4. The paper strips are then spun into yarn.

===== Dyeing and weaving =====
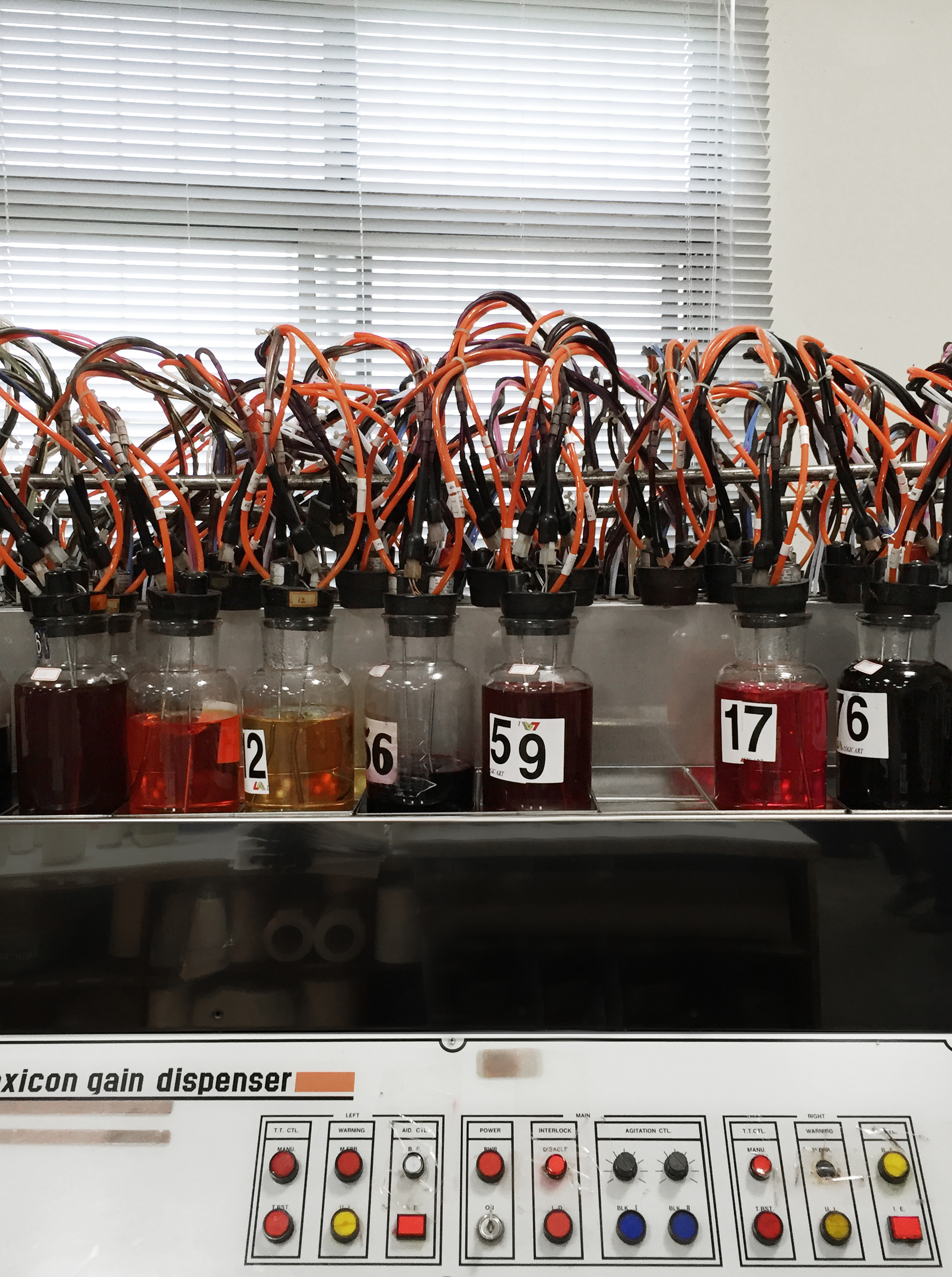
1. The natural white yarn is then coloured using the yarn dyeing method which is more sustainable than the roll dyeing alternative.

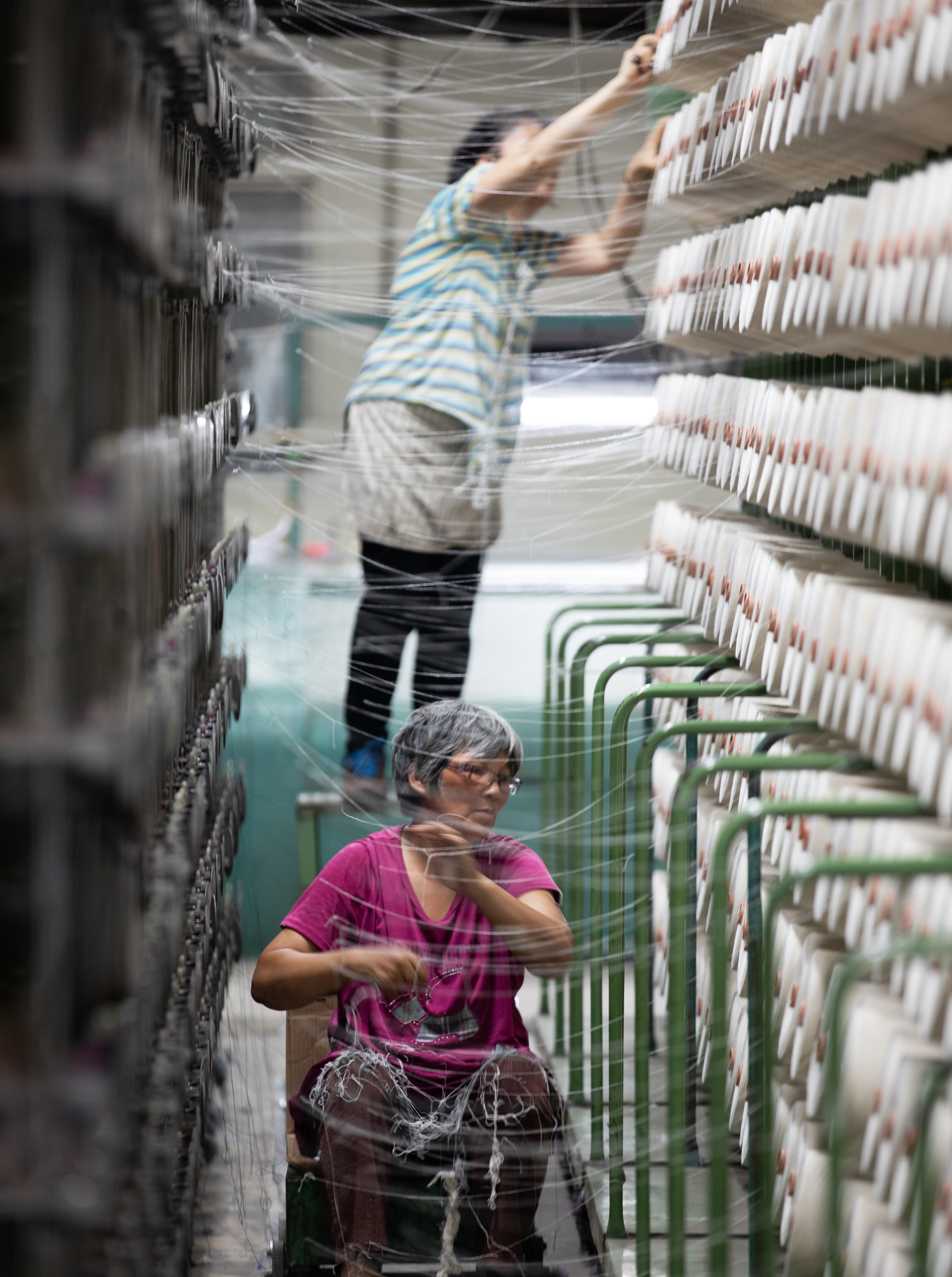
2. The warp yarns are then prepared for weaving.

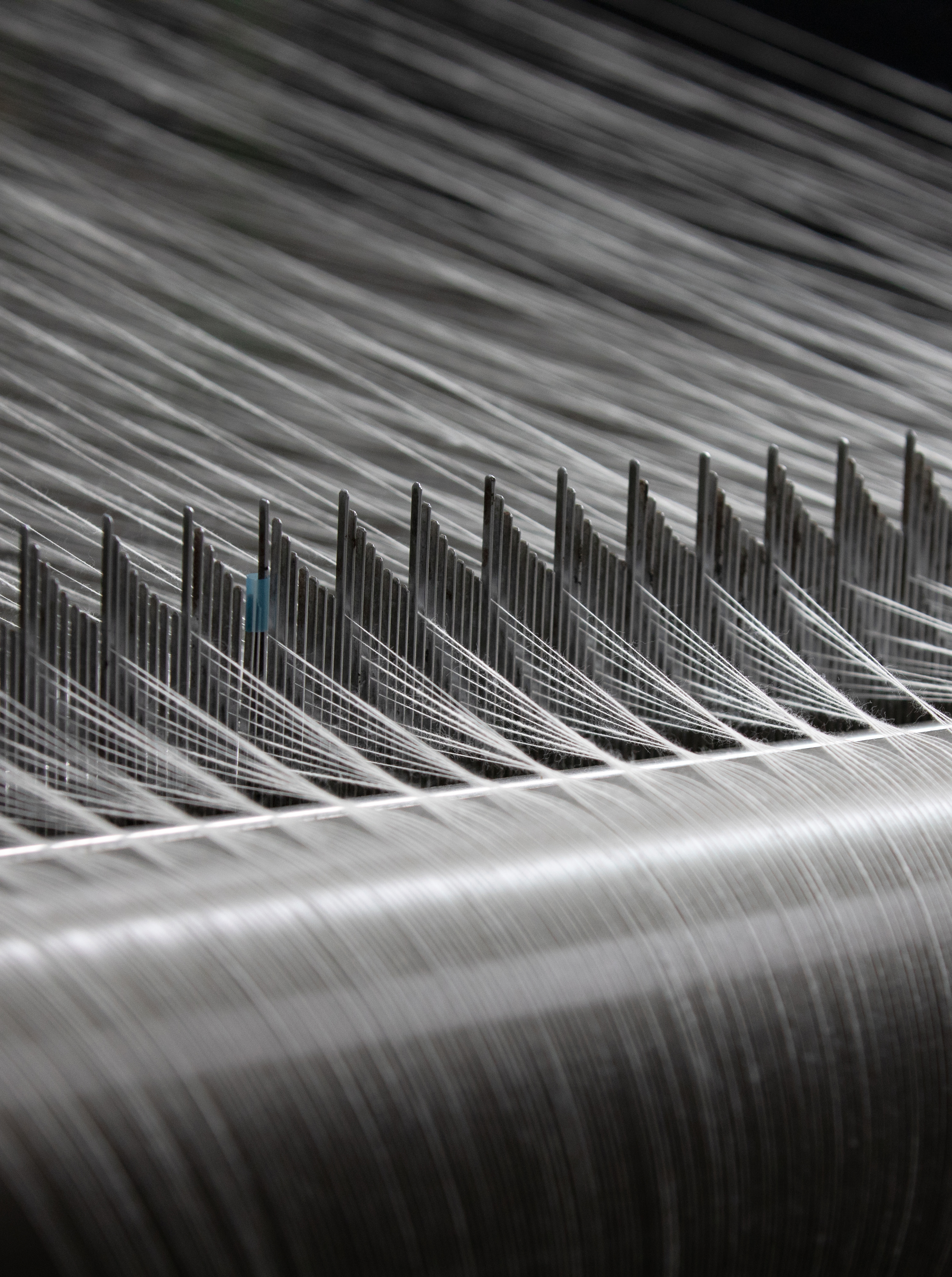
3. The yarn is then woven at extra high density.

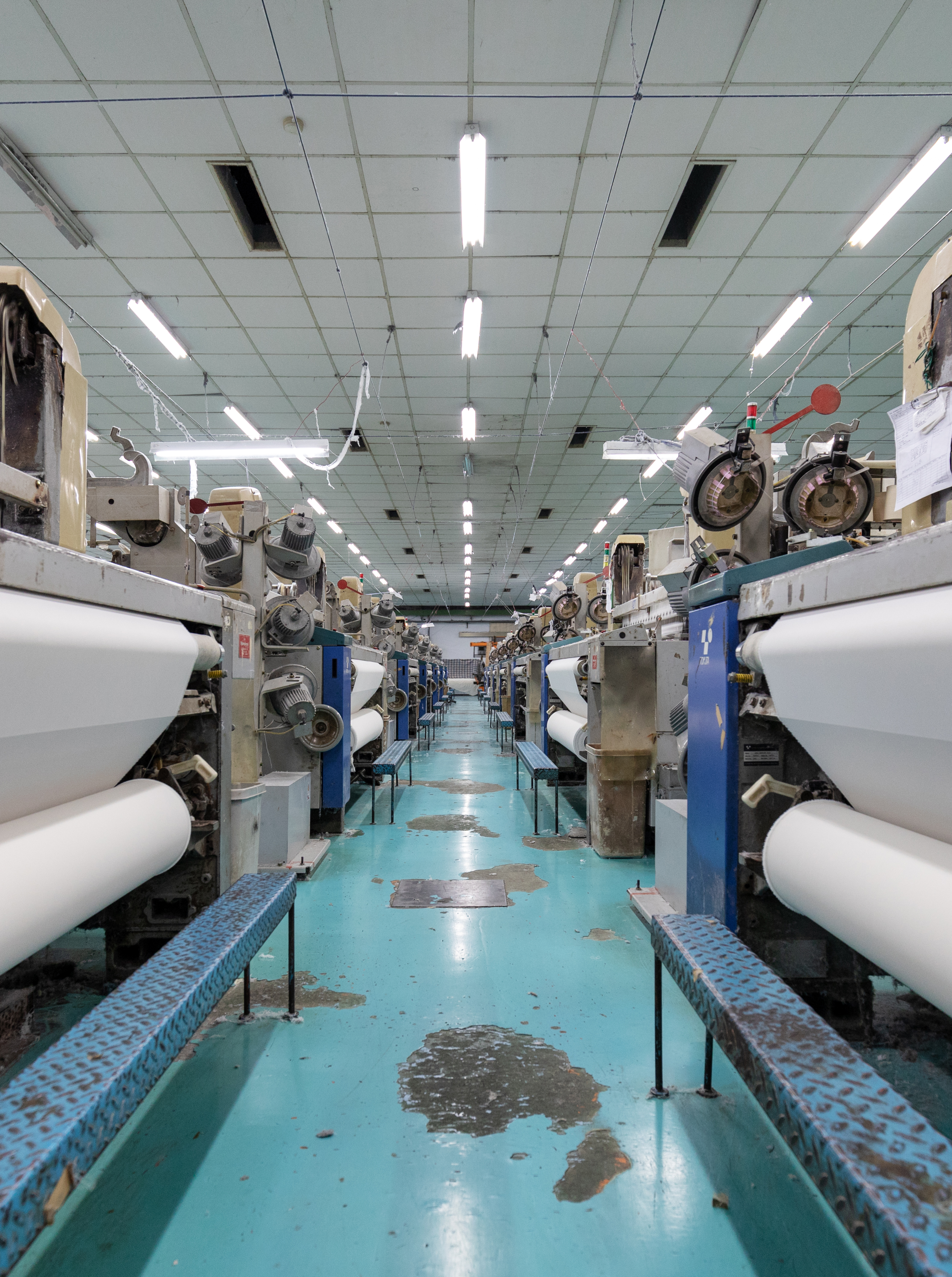
Weaving looms processing the fabric.

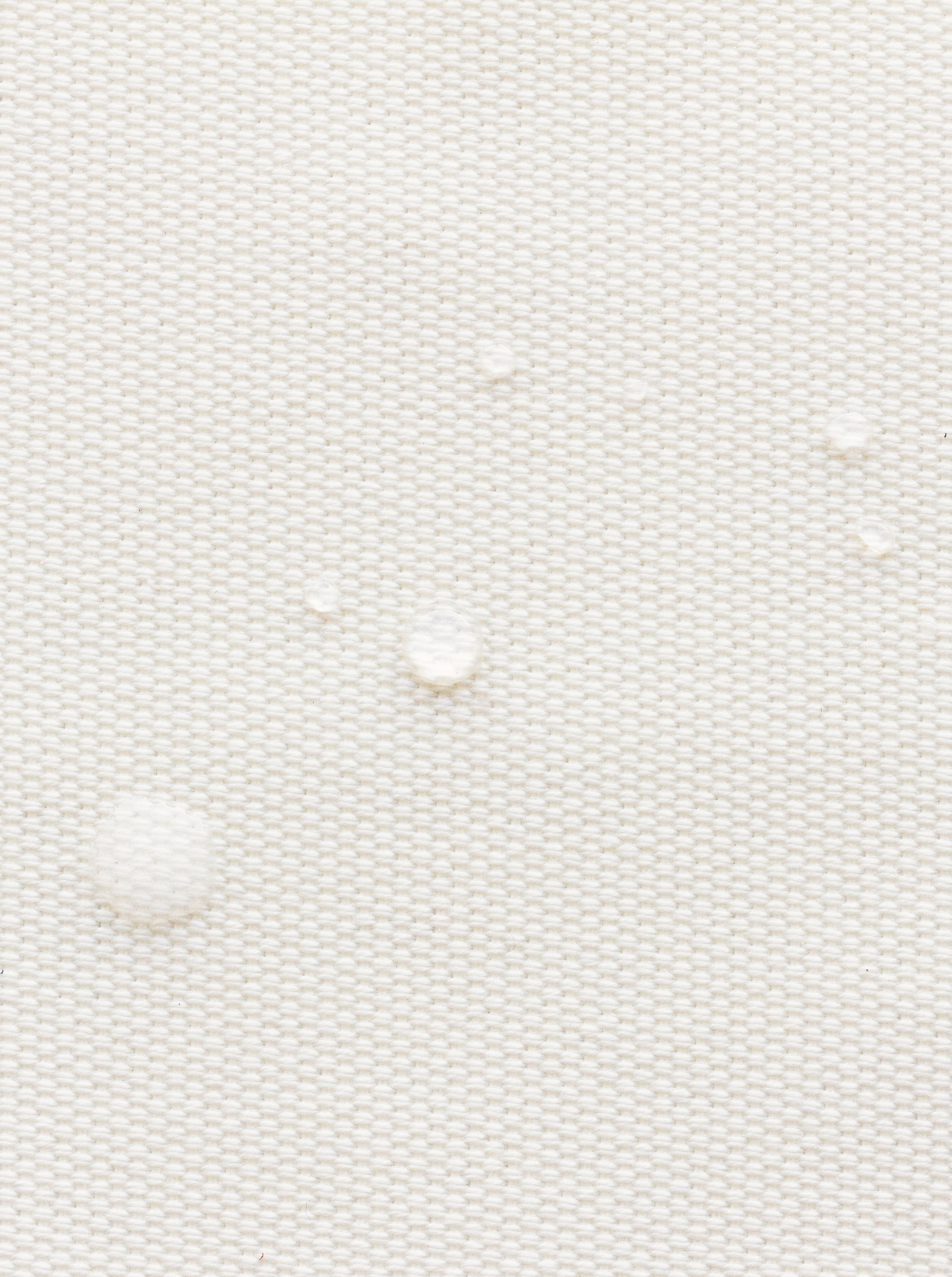
4. The finished Manila hemp fabric, a natural beeswax coating is added to make the fabric waterproof. This particular fabric is manufactured by the Swiss company QWSTION.

=== Manila rope ===
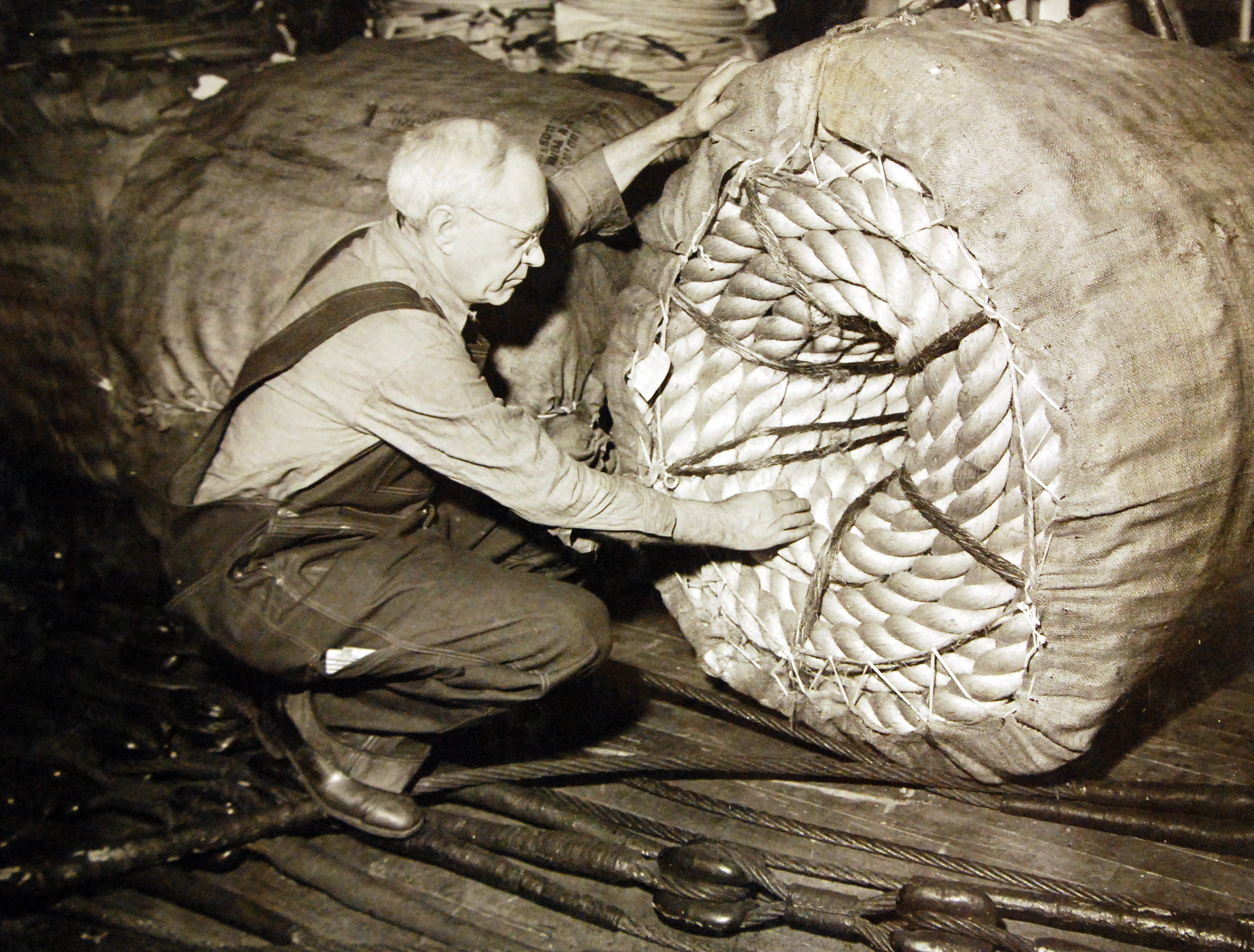
Manila hawser is examined for defects at Brooklyn Navy Yard, New York, circa 1941

Manila rope is a type of rope made from manila hemp. Manila rope is very durable, flexible, and resistant to salt water damage, allowing its use in rope, hawsers, ships' lines, and fishing nets. A 1 inch (2.5 cm) rope can require 4 metric tons (8,800 lb) to break. Manila rope is still the only material specified for lifeboat falls (the ropes with which a ship's lifeboat is lowered) in the United Kingdom.

Manila ropes shrink when they become wet. This effect can be advantageous under certain circumstances, but if it is not a wanted feature, it should be well taken into account. Since shrinkage is more pronounced the first time the rope becomes wet, new rope is usually immersed into water and put to dry before use so that the shrinkage is less than it would be if the rope had never been wet. A major disadvantage in this shrinkage is that many knots made with manila rope became harder and more difficult to untie when wet, thus becoming subject of increased stress. Manila rope will rot after a period of time when exposed to saltwater.

Manila hemp rope was previously the favoured variety of rope used for executions by hanging, both in the U.K. and USA. Usually 3/4 to 1 inch (19 to 25 mm) diameter, boiled prior to use to take out any overelasticity. Abacá fiber was once used primarily for rope, but this application is now of minor significance.

== See also ==
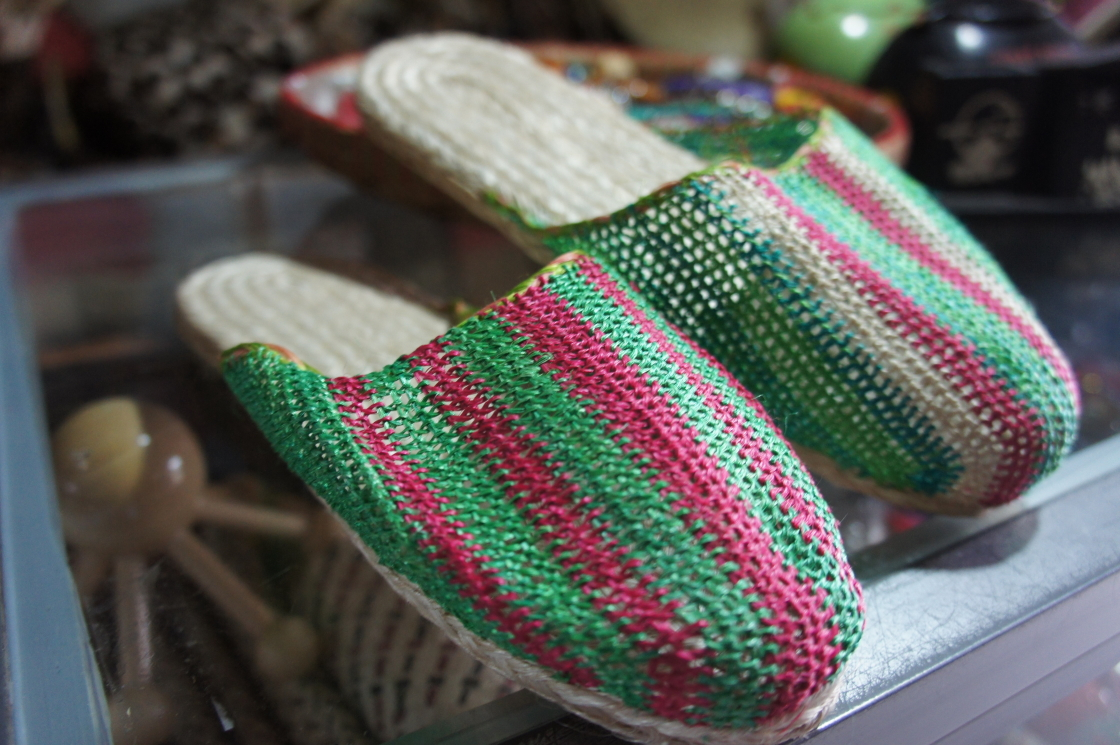
Abaca slippers

- Musa basjoo (Japanese banana), banana species also used as a traditional source of fiber in Okinawa, Japan
- Kijōka-bashōfu, similar traditional fiber from Okinawa, Japan
- Piña
- T'nalak
- Malong
- Tapis
- Inabel
- Batik
- Hablon
- Yakan people
- Fiber crop
- International Year of Natural Fibres
- Natural fiber
- Manila folder
- Domesticated plants and animals of Austronesia
