= Redondoviridae =

Redondoviruses

Virus classification
- (unranked): Virus
- Realm: Monodnaviria
- Kingdom: Shotokuvirae
- Phylum: Cressdnaviricota
- Class: Arfiviricetes
- Order: Recrevirales
- Family: Redondoviridae
- Genus: Torbevirus

Species
- Torbevirus brisa; Torbevirus viento

Family of viruses

Redondoviruses (members of the Redondoviridae) are a family of human-associated DNA viruses. Their name derives from the inferred circular structure of the viral genome (“redondo” means round in Spanish). Redondoviruses have been identified in DNA sequence based surveys of samples from humans, primarily samples from the oral cavity and upper airway.

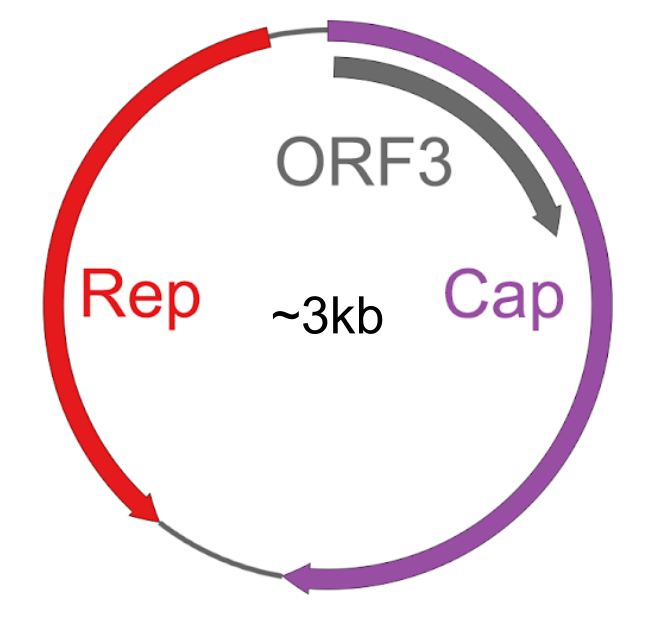
Redondoviridae genome map

== Virology ==
=== Taxonomy ===
Redondoviruses are assigned by the International Committee on Taxonomy of Viruses (ICTV) to the Redondoviridae.

=== Classification ===
The family Redondoviridae contains one genus, Torbevirus, which contains two species, Brisavirus (Torbevirus brisa) and Vientovirus (Torbevirus viento). The names derive from the words for breeze and wind in Spanish (“brisa” and “viento”), denoting the association with the human airway.

The redondoviruses are members of the Circular Rep-Containing Single Stranded (CRESS) DNA Virus group.

- Phylum: Cressdnaviricota
- Class: Arfiviricetes (Ar from arginine; fi from finger; describes a feature of the Rep protein conserved among viruses in this class)
- Order: Recrevirales (Re from redondoviruses; cre from CRESS)

=== Genome ===
The redondovirus genome is circular, and by analogy to other CRESS viruses likely single stranded. Genomes are about 3.0 kilobases in size. The genome encodes three inferred proteins:

- A Rep protein that likely initiates rolling-circle DNA replication
- A capsid protein
- An ORF3 protein of unknown function. ORF3 is entirely encoded within the Cap coding region in a different reading frame.

== Epidemiology ==
=== Distribution ===
Redondovirus genomes have been reported primarily from human samples surveyed using metagenomic DNA sequencing. They have been found primarily in oral and airway specimens. In some human populations, oral samples can show up to 80% Redondovirus positivity.

Analysis of a variety of human-derived sample types showed a strong positive correlation of Redondovirus DNA and DNA of the oral amoeba Entamoeba gingivalis. Follow up studies showed that a xenic culture containing Entamoeba gingivalis and feeder bacteria was also positive for redondovirus DNA and RNA. Analysis using intracellular cross linking (Hi-C) showed crosslinking of redondovirus DNA to Entamoeba DNA, supporting Entamoeba gingivalis as the host.

=== Disease associations ===
It is unknown whether redondoviruses cause human disease. Some CRESS viruses are known pathogens, such as porcine circovirus type 2.

Redondoviruses have been reported associated with periodontitis. In one study, the levels fell with successful treatment. Abundance of redondovirus genomes has also been found to be high in some intensive care unit patients, and in patients with severe COVID-19. At present the basis of these disease associations is unclear.
