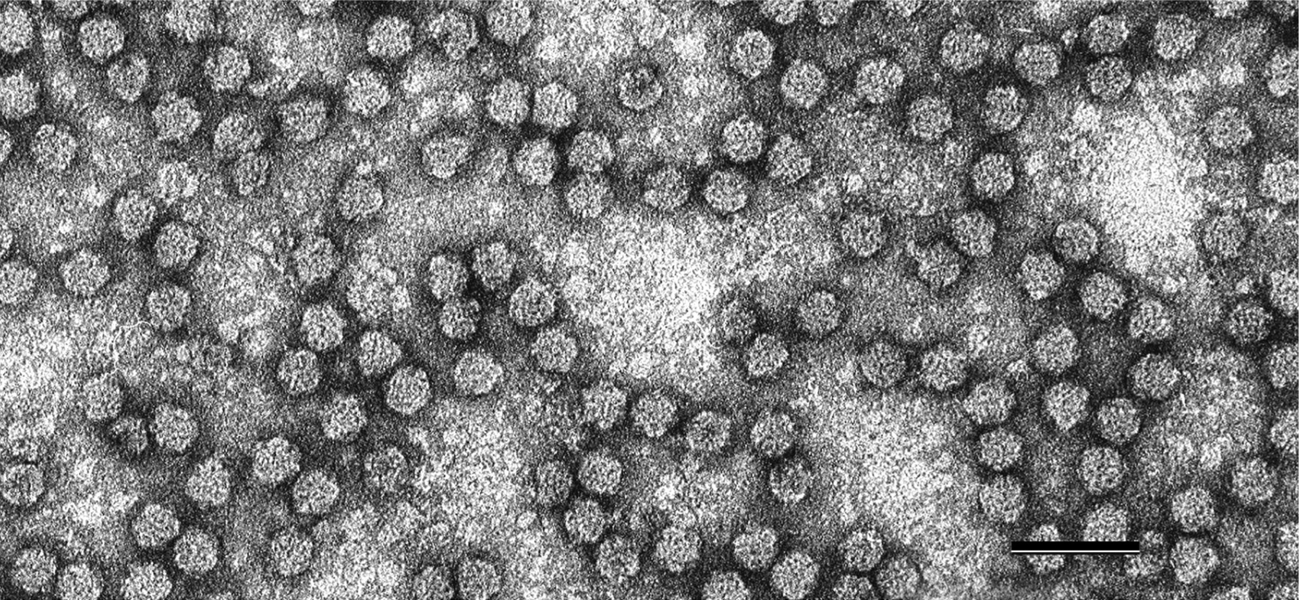
- Faba bean necrotic yellows virus (FBNYV), genus Nanovirus

Virus classification
- (unranked): Virus
- Realm: Monodnaviria
- Kingdom: Shotokuvirae
- Phylum: Cressdnaviricota
- Class: Arfiviricetes
- Order: Mulpavirales
- Family: Nanoviridae

Genera
- Nanovirus; Babuvirus

= Nanoviridae =

Family of viruses

Nanoviridae is a family of viruses. Plants serve as natural hosts. The family contains 2 genera. Diseases associated with this family include: stunting.

== Taxonomy ==
The recognized genera are:

- Babuvirus
- Nanovirus

== Virus structure and genome ==
Viruses in the family Nanoviridae are non-enveloped, with icosahedral and round geometries, and T=1 symmetry. The diameter is around 18–19 nm.

| Genus | Structure | Symmetry | Capsid | Genomic arrangement | Genomic segmentation |
|---|---|---|---|---|---|
| Nanovirus | Icosahedral | T=1 | Non-enveloped | Circular | Segmented |
| Babuvirus | Icosahedral | T=1 | Non-enveloped | Circular | Segmented |

== Life cycle ==
Viral replication is nuclear. Entry into the host cell is achieved by penetration into the host cell. Replication follows the ssDNA rolling circle model. After infection of a host cell, the small DNA molecules that have become encapsidated with the genomic ssDNA act as primers. They bind to complementary regions and help in initiation of DNA synthesis by host polymerases. On completion of synthesis, there will be a double stranded intermediate that is transcribed unidirectionally. Most individual nanovirus particles only encode for a single protein. DNA-templated transcription is the method of transcription. The virus exits the host cell by nuclear pore export, and tubule-guided viral movement. Plants serve as the natural host. The virus is transmitted via a vector (aphids).

| Genus | Host details | Tissue tropism | Entry details | Release details | Replication site | Assembly site | Transmission |
|---|---|---|---|---|---|---|---|
| Nanovirus | Plants: legumes | Phloem | Viral movement; mechanical inoculation | Secretion; viral movement | Nucleus | Nucleus | Aphids |
| Babuvirus | Plants: musa species | Phloem | Viral movement; mechanical inoculation | Secretion; viral movement | Nucleus | Nucleus | Aphids |
