= Smacoviridae =

Virus classification
- (unranked): Virus
- Realm: Monodnaviria
- Kingdom: Shotokuvirae
- Phylum: Cressdnaviricota
- Class: Arfiviricetes
- Order: Cremevirales
- Family: Smacoviridae

Family of viruses

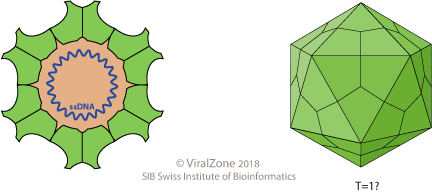
virio

Smacoviridae is a family of single-stranded DNA viruses. The genomes of this family are small (2.3–2.8 kilobases in length). The name Smacoviridae stands for 'small circular genome virus'. The genomes are circular single-stranded DNA and encode rolling-circle replication initiation proteins (Rep) and unique capsid proteins. As of 2021, 12 genera and 84 species are recognized in this family. The viruses in this taxon were isolated from faecal samples from insects and vertebrates by metagenomic methods. Little is known about their biology.

== Taxonomy ==
The family Smacoviridae is the sole member of the order Cremevirales and together with other families of CRESS DNA viruses is included within the phylum Cressdnaviricota.

The family currently includes the following genera:

- Babosmacovirus
- Bonzesmacovirus
- Bostasmacovirus
- Bovismacovirus
- Cosmacovirus
- Dragsmacovirus
- Drosmacovirus
- Felismacovirus
- Huchismacovirus
- Inpeasmacovirus
- Porprismacovirus
- Simismacovirus

== Biology ==
These viruses have single stranded genomes of about 2.5 kilobases in length. The genome encodes two proteins, a Rep (replicator) and a CP (capsid) protein.
