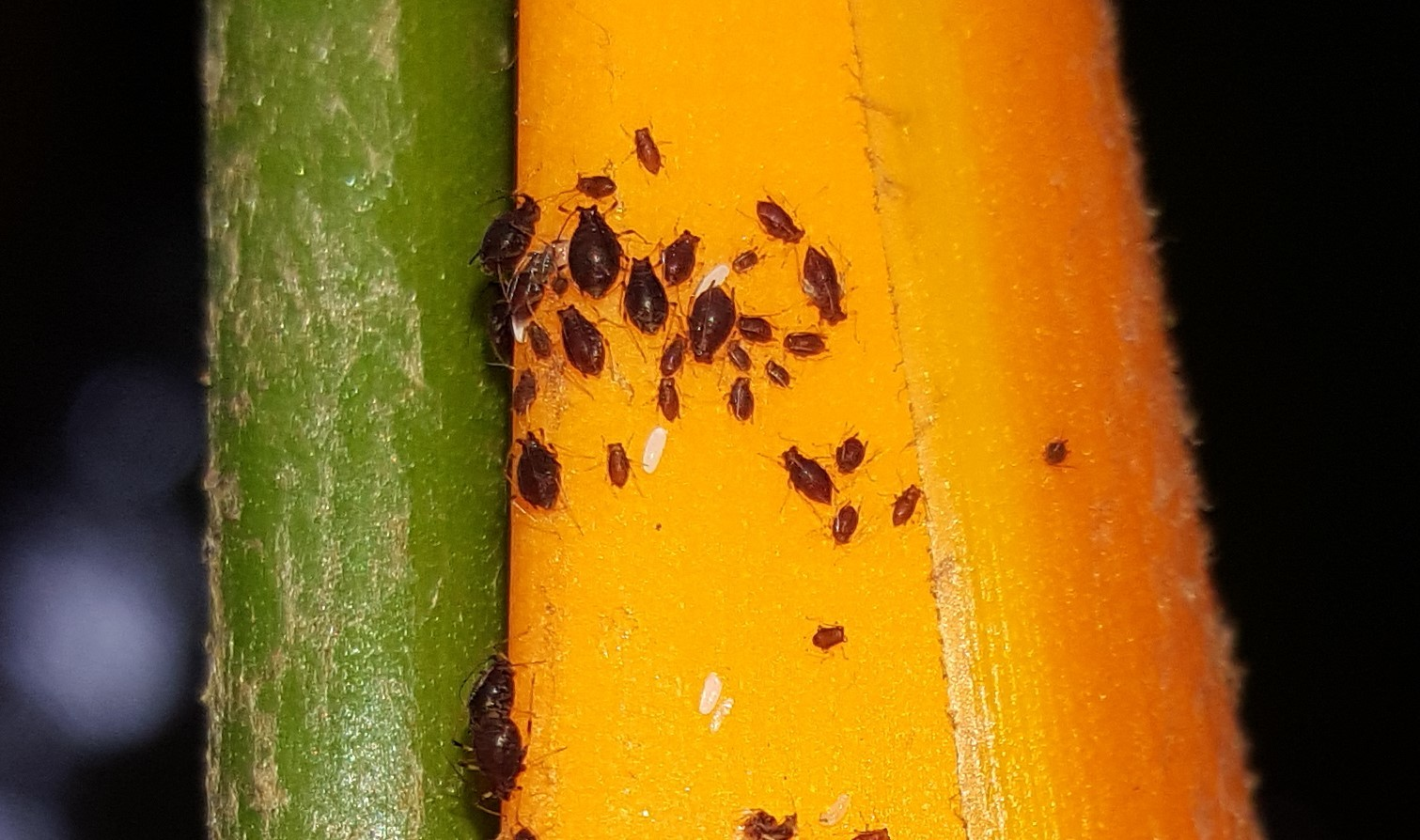

Scientific classification
- Domain: Eukaryota
- Kingdom: Animalia
- Phylum: Arthropoda
- Class: Insecta
- Order: Hemiptera
- Suborder: Sternorrhyncha
- Family: Aphididae
- Genus: Pentalonia
- Species: P. nigronervosa

Binomial name
- Pentalonia nigronervosa (Coquerel, 1859)

= Pentalonia nigronervosa =

Species of true bug

Pentalonia nigronervosa, the banana aphid, is an aphid in the superfamily Aphidoidea in the order Hemiptera. It is a true bug and sucks sap mainly from Musa species.

== Host plants ==
Also known to infest Alpinia purpurata, Xanthosoma sp., cardamom, Heliconia sp., tomatoes, taro, Calla, Costus, and Zingiber sp.
