= Mulpavirales =

Virus classification
- (unranked): Virus
- Realm: Monodnaviria
- Kingdom: Shotokuvirae
- Phylum: Cressdnaviricota
- Class: Arfiviricetes
- Order: Mulpavirales

Order of viruses

Mulpavirales is an order of viruses.

== Taxonomy ==
The following families are assigned to the order:

- Amesuviridae
- Anicreviridae
- Metaxyviridae
- Nanoviridae
