= Arfiviricetes =

Virus classification
- (unranked): Virus
- Realm: Monodnaviria
- Kingdom: Shotokuvirae
- Phylum: Cressdnaviricota
- Class: Arfiviricetes

Orders
- See text

Class of viruses

Arfiviricetes is a class of viruses.

== Orders ==
The following orders are recognized:

- Baphyvirales
- Cirlivirales
- Cremevirales
- Gredzevirales
- Jormunvirales
- Lineavirales
- Mulpavirales
- Recrevirales
- Ringavirales
- Rivendellvirales
- Rohanvirales
- Saturnivirales
