= Beutner =

Beutner is a surname. Notable people with the surname include:

- Austin Beutner (born 1960), American businessman, civic leader, and philanthropist
- Ernst H. Beutner (1923–2013), German-born microbiologist
- Katharine Beutner (born 1982), American novelist, essayist, and academic

== See also ==
- Beutler
