= C4H6N4O2 =

The molecular formula C_{4}H_{6}N_{4}O_{2} (molar mass: 142.12 g/mol, exact mass: 142.0491 u) may refer to:

- Divicine (2,6-diamino-4,5-dihydroxypyrimidine)
- Glycoluril
