= Glucose-6-phosphate dehydrogenase deficiency =

- Other names: Favism
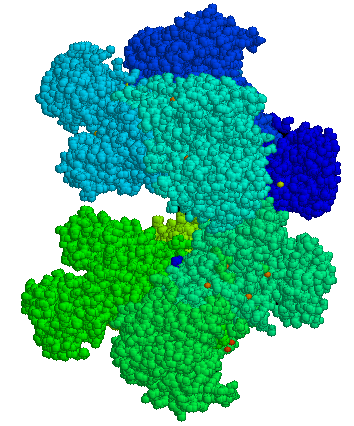
- Glucose-6-phosphate dehydrogenase
- Specialty: Medical genetics
- Symptoms: Yellowish skin, dark urine, shortness of breath
- Complications: Anemia, newborn jaundice
- Usual onset: Within a few days of a trigger
- Causes: Genetic (X-linked recessive)
- Risk factors: Triggered by infections, certain medications, stress, foods such as fava beans
- Diagnostic method: Based on symptoms, blood test, genetic testing
- Differential diagnosis: Pyruvate kinase deficiency, hereditary spherocytosis, sickle cell anemia
- Treatment: Avoiding triggers, medications for infection, stopping offending medication, blood transfusions
- Frequency: 400 million
- Deaths: 33,000 (2015)

Glucose-6-phosphate dehydrogenase deficiency (G6PDD), also known as favism, is the most common enzyme deficiency anemia worldwide. It is an inborn error of metabolism that predisposes to red blood cell breakdown. Most of the time, those who are affected have no symptoms. Following a specific trigger, symptoms such as yellowish skin, dark urine, shortness of breath, and feeling tired may develop. Complications can include anemia and newborn jaundice. Some people never have symptoms.

It is an X-linked recessive disorder that results in defective glucose-6-phosphate dehydrogenase enzyme. Glucose-6-phosphate dehydrogenase is an enzyme that protects red blood cells, which carry oxygen from the lungs to tissues throughout the body, from reactive oxygen species. An enzyme defect results in the premature breakdown of red blood cells. This destruction of red blood cells is called hemolysis. Red blood cell breakdown may be triggered by infections, certain medication, stress, or foods such as fava beans. Depending on the specific mutation the severity of the condition may vary. Diagnosis is based on symptoms and supported by blood tests and genetic testing.

Affected persons must avoid dietary triggers, notably fava beans. This can be difficult, as fava beans may be called "broad beans" and are used in many foods, whole or as flour. Falafel is probably the best known, but fava beans are often used as filler in meatballs and other foods.

Treatment of acute episodes may include medications for infection, stopping the offending medication, or blood transfusions. Jaundice in newborns may be treated with bili lights. It is recommended that people be tested for G6PDD before certain medications, such as primaquine, are taken.

About 400 million people have the condition globally. It is particularly common in certain parts of Africa, Asia, the Mediterranean, and the Middle East. Males are affected more often than females. In 2015, it is believed to have resulted in 33,000 deaths.

== Signs and symptoms ==
Most individuals with G6PD deficiency are asymptomatic. When it induces hemolysis, the effect is usually short-lived.

Most people who develop symptoms are male, due to the X-linked pattern of inheritance, but female carriers can be affected due to unfavorable lyonization or skewed X-inactivation, where random inactivation of an X chromosome in certain cells creates a population of G6PD-deficient red blood cells coexisting with unaffected red blood cells. A female with one affected X chromosome will show the deficiency in approximately half of her red blood cells. However, in some cases, including double X-deficiency, the ratio can be much more than half, making the individual almost as sensitive as males.Red blood cell breakdown (also known as hemolysis) in G6PD deficiency can manifest in many ways, including the following:

- Prolonged neonatal jaundice, possibly leading to kernicterus (arguably the most serious complication of G6PD deficiency)
- Hemolytic crises in response to:
  - Illness (especially infections)
  - Certain drugs (see below)
  - Certain foods, most notably broad beans, from which the word favism derives
  - Certain chemicals
  - Diabetic ketoacidosis
- Hemoglobinuria (red or brown urine)
- Very severe crisis can cause acute kidney injury

Favism is a hemolytic response to the consumption of fava beans, also known as broad beans. Though all individuals with favism show G6PD deficiency, not all individuals with G6PD deficiency show favism. The condition is more prevalent in infants and children, and the G6PD genetic variant can influence chemical sensitivity. Other than this, the specifics of the chemical relationship between favism and G6PD are not well understood.

== Cause ==
G6PD deficiency results from mutations in the G6PD gene. The G6PD gene contributes to the production of glucose-6-phosphate dehydrogenase. Chemical reactions involving glucose-6-phosphate dehydrogenase produce compounds that prevent reactive oxygen species from building up to toxic levels within red blood cells. If a reduction in the amount of glucose-6-phosphate dehydrogenase or alteration of structure occurs due to G6PD gene mutations, the enzyme loses its protective role, leading to the accumulation of reactive oxygen species and thus damaging red blood cells.

=== Triggers ===
Carriers of the underlying mutation do not show any symptoms unless their red blood cells are exposed to certain triggers, which can be of four main types:

- Foods (fava beans is the hallmark trigger for G6PD mutation carriers)
- Certain medicines including rasburicase, primaquine and other antimalarials [PMID 36049896]
- Moth balls (naphthalene)
- Stress from a bacterial or viral infection

==== Drugs ====
Many substances are potentially harmful to people with G6PD deficiency. Variation in response to these substances makes individual predictions difficult. Antimalarial drugs that can cause acute hemolysis in people with G6PD deficiency include primaquine and tafenoquine. Dapsone, methylene blue, pegloticase, rasburicase, and toluidine should also be avoided by people with G6PD deficiency.(CPIC guideline G6PD ) Henna has been linked to hemolytic crisis in G6PD-deficient infants. Rasburicase is contraindicated in G6PD deficiency. Over 40 medications, including ascorbic acid at high doses and sulfonamides, have been hypothesized to be linked to hemolysis in G6PD-deficient individuals, but the evidence supporting most of these medications is lacking.Clinical Pharmacogenetics Implementation Consortium;

=== Genetics ===
Two variants (G6PD A− and G6PD Mediterranean) are the most common in human populations. G6PD A− has an occurrence of 10% of Africans and African-Americans, while G6PD Mediterranean is prevalent in the Middle East. The known distribution of the mutated allele is largely limited to people of Mediterranean origins (Spaniards, Italians, Greeks, Armenians, Sephardi Jews, and other Semitic peoples). Both variants are believed to stem from a strongly protective effect against Plasmodium falciparum and Plasmodium vivax malaria. It is particularly frequent in the Kurdish Jewish population, wherein approximately 1 in 2 males have the condition, and the same rate of females are carriers. It is also common in African American, Saudi Arabian, Sardinian males, some African populations, and Asian groups.All mutations that cause G6PD deficiency are found on the long arm of the X chromosome, on band Xq28. The G6PD gene spans some 18.5 kilobases. The following variants and mutations are well-known and described:

Descriptive mutations
Mutation				Gene			Protein		
Designation	Short name	Isoform G6PD-Protein	OMIM-Code	Type	Subtype	Position	Position	Structure change	Function change
G6PD-A(+)	Gd-A(+)	G6PD A	+305900.0001	Polymorphism nucleotide	A→G	376 (Exon 5)	126	Asparagine→Aspartic acid (ASN126ASP)	No enzyme defect (variant)
G6PD-A(-)	Gd-A(-)	G6PD A	+305900.0002	Substitution nucleotide	G→A	376 (Exon 5) and 202	68 and 126	Valine→Methionine (VAL68MET); Asparagine→Aspartic acid (ASN126ASP)	
G6PD-Mediterranean	Gd-Med	G6PD B	+305900.0006	Substitution nucleotide	C→T	563 (Exon 6)	188	Serine→Phenylalanine (SER188PHE)	Class II
G6PD-Canton	Gd-Canton	G6PD B	+305900.0021	Substitution nucleotide	G→T	1376	459	Arginine→Leucine (ARG459LEU)	Class II
G6PD-Chatham	Gd-Chatham	G6PD	+305900.0003	Substitution nucleotide	G→A	1003	335	Alanine→Threonine (ALA335THR)	Class II
G6PD-Cosenza	Gd-Cosenza	G6PD B	+305900.0059	Substitution nucleotide	G→C	1376	459	Arginine→Proline (ARG459PRO)	G6PD-activity <10%, thus high portion of patients.
G6PD-Mahidol	Gd-Mahidol	G6PD	+305900.0005	Substitution nucleotide	G→A	487 (Exon 6)	163	Glycine→Serine (GLY163SER)	Class III
G6PD-Orissa	Gd-Orissa	G6PD	+305900.0047	Substitution nucleotide	C→G	131	44	Alanine→Glycine (ALA44GLY)	NADP-binding place affected. Higher stability than other variants.
G6PD-Asahi	Gd-Asahi	G6PD A-	+305900.0054	Substitution nucleotide (several)	A→G ± G→A	376 (Exon 5); 202	126; 68	Asparagine→Aspartic acid (ASN126ASP); Valine→Methionine (VAL68MET)	Class III.

== Pathophysiology ==
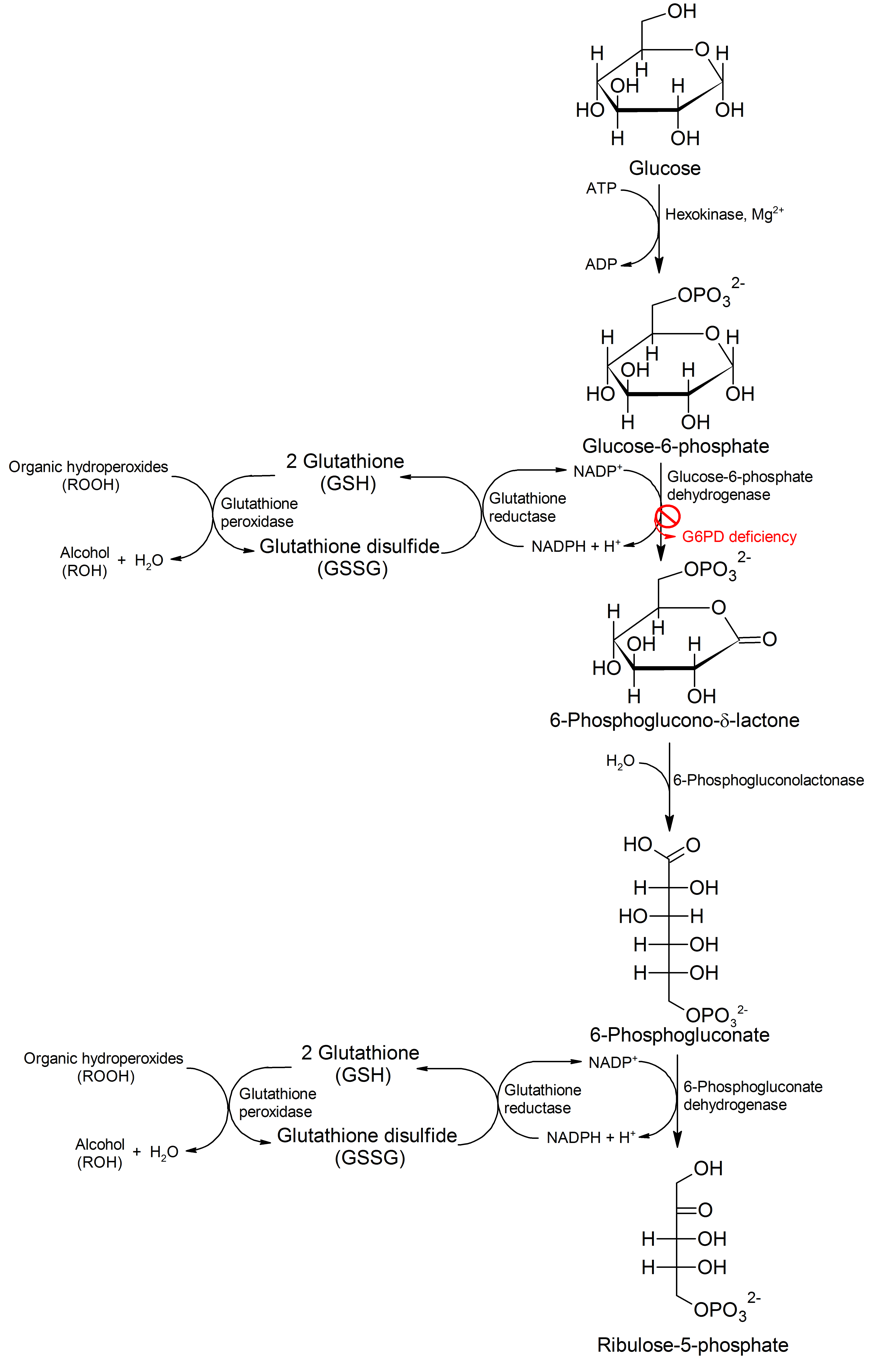

Glucose-6-phosphate dehydrogenase (G6PD) is an enzyme in the pentose phosphate pathway (see image, also known as the HMP shunt pathway). G6PD converts glucose-6-phosphate into 6-phosphoglucono-δ-lactone. It is the rate-limiting enzyme of this metabolic pathway that supplies reducing energy to cells by maintaining the level of the reduced form of the co-enzyme nicotinamide adenine dinucleotide phosphate (NADPH). The NADPH maintains the supply of reduced glutathione in the cells that are used to mop up free radicals that cause oxidative damage. The pathway also stimulates catalase, an antioxidant enzyme.

The G6PD / NADPH oxidative pathway is the only source of reduced glutathione in red blood cells (erythrocytes). The role of red cells as oxygen carriers puts them at substantial risk of damage from oxidizing free radicals except for the protective effect of G6PD/NADPH/glutathione.

People with G6PD deficiency are therefore at risk of hemolytic anemia in states of oxidative stress. Oxidative stress can result from infection and from chemical exposure to medication and certain foods. Broad beans, e.g., fava beans, contain high levels of vicine, divicine, convicine, and isouramil, all of which create oxidants.

When all remaining reduced glutathione is consumed, enzymes and other proteins (including hemoglobin) are subsequently damaged by the oxidants, leading to cross-bonding and protein deposition in the red cell membranes. Damaged red cells are phagocytosed and sequestered (taken out of circulation) in the spleen. The hemoglobin is metabolized to bilirubin (causing jaundice at high concentrations). The red cells rarely disintegrate in the circulation, so hemoglobin is rarely excreted directly by the kidney, but this can occur in severe cases, causing acute kidney injury.

Deficiency of G6PD in the alternative pathway causes the buildup of glucose, and thus an increase of advanced glycation endproducts (AGE). The deficiency also reduces the amount of NADPH, which is required for nitric oxide (NO) synthesis. The high prevalence of diabetes mellitus type 2 and hypertension in Afro-Caribbeans in the West could be directly related to the incidence of G6PD deficiency in those populations.

Although female carriers can have a mild form of G6PD deficiency (dependent on the degree of inactivation of the unaffected X chromosome – see Skewed X-inactivation), homozygous females have been described; in these females, there is co-incidence of a rare immune disorder termed chronic granulomatous disease (CGD).

== Diagnosis ==
The diagnosis is generally suspected when patients from certain ethnic groups (see epidemiology) develop anemia, jaundice, and symptoms of hemolysis after challenges from any of the above causes, especially when there is a positive family history.

Generally, tests will include:

- Complete blood count and reticulocyte count; in active G6PD deficiency, Heinz bodies can be seen in red blood cells on a blood film;
- Liver enzymes (to exclude other causes of jaundice);
- Lactate dehydrogenase (elevated in hemolysis and a marker of hemolytic severity)
- Haptoglobin (decreased in hemolysis);
- A "direct antiglobulin test" (Coombs' test) – this should be negative, as hemolysis in G6PD is not immune-mediated;

When there are sufficient grounds to suspect G6PD, a direct test for G6PD is the "Beutler fluorescent spot test", which has largely replaced an older test (the Motulsky dye-decolouration test). Other possibilities are direct DNA testing and/or sequencing of the G6PD gene.

The Beutler fluorescent spot test is a rapid and inexpensive test that visually identifies NADPH produced by G6PD under ultraviolet light. When the blood spot does not fluoresce, the test is positive; it can be falsely negative in patients who are actively hemolysing. It can therefore only be done 2–3 weeks after a hemolytic episode.

When a macrophage in the spleen identifies an RBC with a Heinz body, it removes the precipitate and a small piece of the membrane, leading to characteristic "bite cells". However, if a large number of Heinz bodies are produced, as occurs in G6PD deficiency, some Heinz bodies will be visible when viewing RBCs stained with crystal violet. This easy and inexpensive test can lead to an initial presumption of G6PD deficiency, which can be confirmed with the other tests.

Testing during and for many weeks after a hemolytic episode will lead to false-negative results, as the G6PD-deficient RBC will have been excreted, and the young RBC (reticulocyte) will not yet be G6PD deficient. False-negative results will also be likely following any blood transfusions. For this reason, many hospitals wait three months after a hemolytic episode before testing for G6PD deficiency. Females should have their G6PD activity measured by a quantitative assay to avoid being misclassified by screening tests.

=== Classification ===
The World Health Organization classifies G6PD genetic variants into five classes, the first three of which are deficiency states.

- Class I: Severe deficiency (<10% activity) with chronic (nonspherocytic) hemolytic anemia
- Class II: Severe deficiency (<10% activity), with intermittent hemolysis
- Class III: Moderate deficiency (10–60% activity), hemolysis with stressors only
- Class IV: Non-deficient variant, no clinical sequelae
- Class V: Increased enzyme activity, no clinical sequelae

=== Differential diagnosis ===
6-phosphogluconate dehydrogenase (6PGD) deficiency has similar symptoms and is often mistaken for G6PD deficiency, as the affected enzyme is within the same pathway; however, these diseases are not linked and can be found within the same person.

== Treatment ==
The most important measure is prevention – avoidance of the drugs and foods that cause hemolysis. Vaccination against some common pathogens (e.g. hepatitis A and hepatitis B) may prevent infection-induced attacks.In the acute phase of hemolysis, blood transfusions might be necessary, or even dialysis in acute kidney failure. Blood transfusion is an important symptomatic measure, as the transfused red cells are generally not G6PD deficient and will live a normal lifespan in the recipient's circulation. Those affected should avoid drugs such as aspirin.

Some patients may benefit from the removal of the spleen (splenectomy), as this is an important site of red cell destruction. Folic acid should be used in any disorder featuring a high red cell turnover. Although vitamin E and selenium have antioxidant properties, their use does not decrease the severity of G6PD deficiency.

AG1, a recently discovered small molecule, has been shown to increase the activity of the G6PD enzyme in the three common variants of the deficiency. Due to the absence of medications to treat G6PD, AG1 is a promising precursor in developing a pharmacological treatment effective for multiple G6PD enzymopathies.

== Prognosis ==
G6PD-deficient individuals do not appear to acquire any illnesses more frequently than other people, and may have less risk than other people for acquiring ischemic heart disease and cerebrovascular disease. However, a recent study revealed that G6PD deficiency increases cardiovascular risk by up to 70%. The risk conferred by G6PD deficiency is moderate compared with the impact of primary cardiovascular risk factors. Besides, a published review hypothesized that G6PD deficiency could reduce the antiplatelet efficacy of clopidogrel (clopidogrel resistance).

== Epidemiology ==
G6PD deficiency is the second most common human enzyme defect after ALDH2 deficiency, being present in more than 400 million people worldwide. G6PD deficiency resulted in 4,100 deaths in 2013 and 3,400 deaths in 1990. The Mediterranean Basin is where favism is most common, especially among Kurds, Sardinians, Cypriots, Greeks, Egyptians and some African populations, including those who have these ancestries. Favism has also been documented outside of the Mediterranean basin, in other Middle Eastern and East Asian nations like Iraq, Iran, Bulgaria and China. Sardinia has the highest reported frequency of favism, with five instances per 1,000 people.

A side effect of this disease is that it confers protection against malaria, in particular the form of malaria caused by Plasmodium falciparum, the most deadly form of malaria. A similar relationship exists between malaria and sickle-cell disease. One theory to explain this is that cells infected with the Plasmodium parasite are cleared more rapidly by the spleen. This phenomenon might give G6PD deficiency carriers an evolutionary advantage by increasing their fitness in malaria-endemic environments. In vitro studies have shown that Plasmodium falciparum is very sensitive to oxidative damage. This is the basis for another theory: the genetic defect confers resistance since the G6PD-deficient host has a higher level of oxidative agents that, while generally tolerable by the host, are deadly to the parasite.

== History ==
The modern understanding of the condition began with the analysis of patients who exhibited sensitivity to primaquine. The discovery of G6PD deficiency relied heavily upon the testing of prisoner volunteers at Illinois State Penitentiary, a type of study which today is considered unethical and cannot be performed. When some prisoners were given the drug primaquine, some developed hemolytic anemia, but others did not. Despite these results, the US military administered the drug widely during the Korean War to prevent the relapsing infection caused by Plasmodium vivax hypnozoites. Numerous cases of hemolytic anemia were observed in US soldiers of North African and Mediterranean descent.

After studying the mechanism through Cr^{51} testing, it was conclusively shown that the hemolytic effect of primaquine was due to an intrinsic defect of erythrocytes.

== Society and culture ==
In both legend and mythology, favism has been known since antiquity. The priests of various Greco-Roman era cults were forbidden to eat or even mention beans, and Pythagoras had a strict rule that to join the society of the Pythagoreans one had to swear off beans. This ban was supposedly because beans resembled male genitalia. It is possible that this was because of a belief that beans and humans were created from the same material.
