= Beutler =

Beutler (German for sacker, bagger or bag maker) is a surname. Notable people with the surname include:

- Andreas Beutler (born 1963), ice hockey player
- Annette Beutler (born 1976), Swiss cyclist
- August Frederik Beutler (c. 1728), ensign in the employ of the Dutch East India Company
- Betsy Beutler, American actress
- Bruce Beutler (born 1957), American immunologist and geneticist
- Chris Beutler (born 1944), American politician from Nebraska
- Ernest Beutler (1928–2008), German hematologist and biomedical scientist
- Frederick J. Beutler, American mathematician, engineer, and academic
- Heinz Beutler, Swiss curler
- Jaime Herrera Beutler (born 1978), American politician from Washington
- Larry E. Beutler (born 1941), clinical psychologist
- Rolf Beutler (born 1940), Swiss sport shooter

== Companies ==
- Carrosserie Beutler, Swiss coachbuilder

== See also ==
- Beutler test, also known as the fluorescent spot test, a screening test used to identify enzyme defects
