= Faba bean necrotic stunt virus =

Virus classification
- (unranked): Virus
- Realm: Monodnaviria
- Kingdom: Shotokuvirae
- Phylum: Cressdnaviricota
- Class: Arfiviricetes
- Order: Mulpavirales
- Family: Nanoviridae
- Genus: Nanovirus
- Species: Nanovirus necropumiliviciae

Species of virus

Faba bean necrotic stunt virus (FBNSV) is a pathogenic plant virus of the family Nanoviridae. Its infection cycle is remarkable because it has eight segments, each carried in a different particle, that can replicate independently in different host cells and then reassemble outside of the host cells into new complete virions.
