= Keith W. Ross =

American scholar of computer science

- Born: Keith W. Ross
- Education: Tufts (B.S.); Columbia (M.S.); U. Michigan (Ph.D.)
- Scientific career
- Fields: Computer science
- Institutions: Univ. of Pennsylvania; Eurecom; New York University
- Thesis: (1985)
- Doctoral advisor: Frederick J. Beutler

Keith W. Ross is an American scholar of computer science whose research has focused on Markov decision processes, queuing theory, computer networks, peer-to-peer networks, Internet privacy, social networks, and deep reinforcement learning. He is the Dean of Engineering and Computer Science at NYU Shanghai and a computer science professor at the New York University Tandon School of Engineering.

== Career ==
Ross received his Bachelor of Science degree from Tufts University in electrical engineering, as well as a master's in electrical engineering from Columbia University. He earned his Ph.D. in computer and control engineering from the University of Michigan, advised by Frederick J. Beutler. From 1985 until 1998 he served as a professor at the University of Pennsylvania. In 1995, Ross authored the research monograph Multiservice Loss Models for Broadband Communication Networks. In 1998, Ross joined the multimedia communication department at Eurecom Institute.

In 1999, he cofounded Wimba, which developed voice and video applications for online learning using voice-over-IP; he served as CEO and CTO from 1999 to 2001. Wimba was acquired by Blackboard in 2010.

In 2000, he co-authored the textbook Computer Networking: A Top Down Approach.

== Awards ==
Ross was named a fellow of the Association for Computing Machinery (ACM). He is also a fellow of the Institute of Electrical and Electronics Engineers (IEEE) for contributions to design and analysis of computer networks.

He received the Infocom 2009 Best Paper Award, and the Best Paper Award for Multimedia Communications (awarded by IEEE Communications Society) in 2011 and 2008. He has served on numerous journal editorial boards and conference program committees, including IEEE/ACM Transactions on Networking, ACM SIGCOMM, ACM CoNext, and ACM Internet Measurement Conference. He also has served as an advisor to the Federal Trade Commission on peer-to-peer file sharing.

== Publications ==
- Ross, Keith W. (1995). Multiservice Loss Models for Broadband Telecommunication Networks. ISBN 978-1-4471-2126-8. Springer.
- Kurose, James F., Ross, Keith W. (2000). Computer Networking: A Top Down Approach. ISBN 978-0273768968 Pearson Education, Inc.
