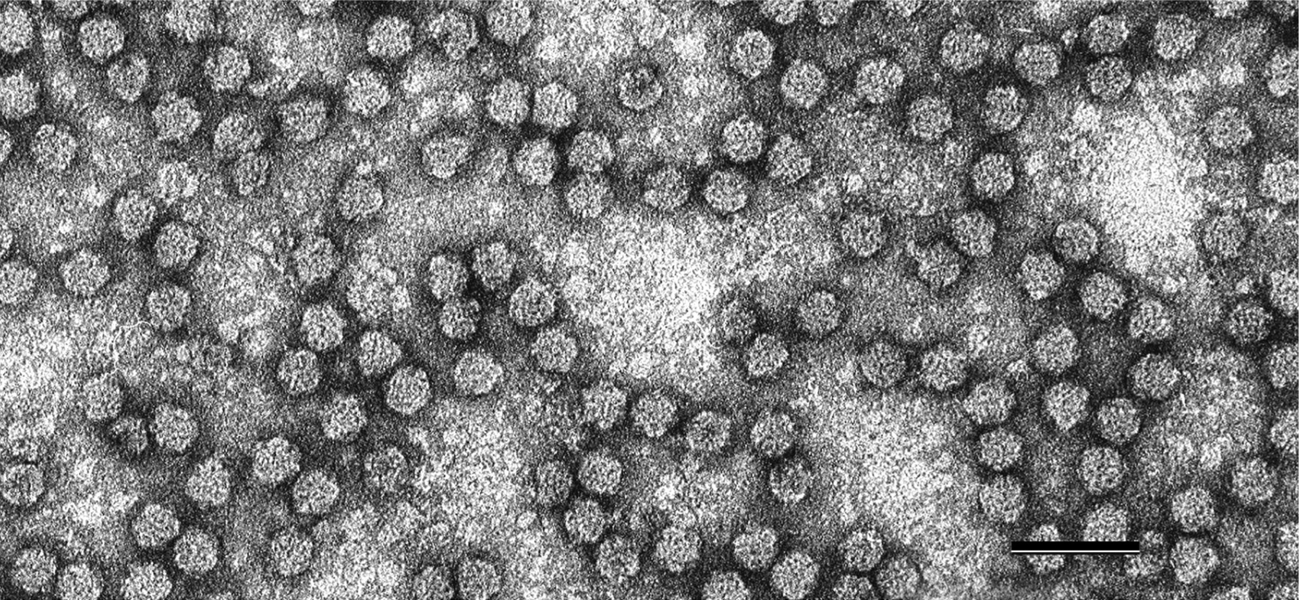
- Faba bean necrotic yellows virus (FBNYV)

Virus classification
- (unranked): Virus
- Realm: Floreoviria
- Kingdom: Shotokuvirae
- Phylum: Cressdnaviricota
- Class: Arfiviricetes
- Order: Mulpavirales
- Family: Nanoviridae
- Genus: Nanovirus

= Nanovirus =

Genus of viruses

Nanovirus is a genus of viruses, in the family Nanoviridae. Legume plants serve as natural hosts. There are 12 species in this genus. Diseases associated with this genus include: stunting, severe necrosis and early plant death.

== Taxonomy ==
The genus contains the following species, listed by scientific name and followed by the exemplar virus of the species:

- Nanovirus astragali, Milk vetch dwarf virus
- Nanovirus astragalirani, Milk vetch chlorotic dwarf virus
- Nanovirus flavipisi, Pea yellow stunt virus
- Nanovirus flaviviciae, Faba bean yellow leaf virus
- Nanovirus medicagonis, Black medic leaf roll virus
- Nanovirus necroflaviviciae, Faba bean necrotic yellows virus
- Nanovirus necropisi, Pea necrotic yellow dwarf virus
- Nanovirus necropumiliviciae, Faba bean necrotic stunt virus
- Nanovirus petroselini, Parsley severe stunt associated virus
- Nanovirus sophorae, Sophora yellow stunt virus
- Nanovirus trifolii, Subterranean clover stunt virus
- Nanovirus viciacraccae, Cow vetch latent virus

== Structure and genome ==
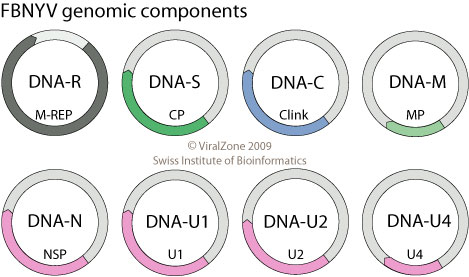
Genome map of species Faba bean necrotic yellows virus (FBNYV) showing 8 segments.

Virions in the genus Nanovirus are non-enveloped, with icosahedral and round geometries, and T=1 symmetry. The diameter is around 18-19 nm.

The genome is multipartite, and the genome components (6 or 8, depending on the genus) are circular, around 1kb in length, essentially carry only one gene, and are individually encapsidated forming small icosahedral virions (18–20 nm).

Genus	Structure	Symmetry	Capsid	Genomic arrangement	Genomic segmentation
Nanovirus	Icosahedral	T=1	Non-enveloped	Circular	Segmented

== Life cycle ==
Viral replication is nuclear. Entry into the host cell is achieved by penetration into the host cell. Replication follows the ssDNA rolling circle model. DNA-templated transcription is the method of transcription. The virus exits the host cell by nuclear pore export, and tubule-guided viral movement. Legume plants serve as the natural host. The virus is transmitted via a vector (the virus does not replicate in this). Transmission routes are vector.

Genus	Host details	Tissue tropism	Entry details	Release details	Replication site	Assembly site	Transmission
Nanovirus	Plants: legumes	Phloem	Viral movement; mechanical inoculation	Secretion; viral movement	Nucleus	Nucleus	Aphids
