= Vicine =

Names
- IUPAC name 2,6-Diamino-5-(β-D-glucopyranosyloxy)pyrimidin-4(1H)-one
- Systematic IUPAC name 2,6-Diamino-5-{[(2S,3R,4S,5S,6R)-3,4,5-trihydroxy-6-(hydroxymethyl)oxan-2-yl]oxy}pyrimidin-4(1H)-one

Identifiers
CAS Number	152-93-2
3D model (JSmol)	Interactive image
ChemSpider	82575
ECHA InfoCard	100.005.283
PubChem CID	135413566
UNII	COL14PJW3X
CompTox Dashboard (EPA)	DTXSID80876124
- InChI: InChI=1S/C10H16N4O7/c11-7-6(8(19)14-10(12)13-7)21-9-5(18)4(17)3(16)2(1-15)20-9/h2-5,9,15-18H,1H2,(H5,11,12,13,14,19)/t2-,3-,4+,5-,9+/m1/s1 Key: KGNGTSCIQCLKEH-SYCVNHKBSA-N; InChI=1/C10H16N4O7/c11-7-6(8(19)14-10(12)13-7)21-9-5(18)4(17)3(16)2(1-15)20-9/h2-5,9,15-18H,1H2,(H5,11,12,13,14,19)/t2-,3-,4+,5-,9+/m1/s1 Key: KGNGTSCIQCLKEH-SYCVNHKBBM
- SMILES: O=C2\N=C(\N)NC(=C2/O[C@@H]1O[C@@H]([C@@H](O)[C@H](O)[C@H]1O)CO)/N

Properties
Chemical formula	C_{10}H_{16}N_{4}O_{7}
Molar mass	304.259 g·mol^{−1}
- Except where otherwise noted, data are given for materials in their standard state (at 25 °C [77 °F], 100 kPa). verify (what is ?) Infobox references

Vicine is an alkaloid glycoside found mainly in fava beans, which are also called broad beans (Vicia faba). Vicine is toxic in individuals who have a hereditary loss of the enzyme glucose-6-phosphate dehydrogenase. It causes haemolytic anaemia, called favism. The formation of vicine in Vicia faba has been studied, but this natural formation has not yet been found.

== History ==
Vicine was initially isolated in 1870 from the seeds of Vicia sativa by a method of extraction with sulfuric acid and subsequent precipitation with mercury sulfate (HgSO_{4}). Later vicine was also found in other Vicia species, namely Vicia faba, beet juice and peas. The chemical structure of the compound was built gradually. First the glycosidic nature of the compound was recognized in 1896. The same year the aglycone of vicine, divicine, was isolated. In the beginning of the 20th century the pyrimidine structure was recognized. Despite these initial successes, the correct formula of vicine was determined only in 1953 and it is 2,4-diamino-6-oxypyrimidine-5-(β-D-glucopyranoside).

== Metabolism ==
Vicine is an inactive compound in the body. When vicine enters the body through food, it is hydrolysed by intestinal microflora to the highly reactive free radical generating aglycone divicine. Upon hydrolysis, the glucose part of the molecule is split off and that results in the reduced divicine. Divicine is then taken up in the blood through the intestinal epithelium.

== Adverse effects ==
Adverse effects almost solely occur in humans that suffer from glucose-6-phosphate dehydrogenase deficiency. This deficiency causes a shortage of glutathione in erythrocytes and glutathione is needed for the neutralization of ROS (reactive oxygen species) created by the strongly oxidizing agent divicine. Glucose-6-phosphate dehydrogenase deficiency is a common genetic condition, with a global prevalence of approximately 4.9%, affecting over 400 million individuals worldwide. It is important to recognize that glucose-6-phosphate dehydrogenase deficiency can still be life-threatening if not promptly diagnosed and managed. Effective management often includes interventions as blood transfusions, but with appropriate care, full recovery from favism without lasting complications is the expected outcome.

=== Indications ===
Persons with G6PD deficiency are asymptomatic. An attack of acute haemolytic anaemia can appear out of nowhere and can be very severe and life-threatening. Indications of such a sudden attack of favism are dark urine, pallor, jaundice, abdominal pain and in most cases fever.

== Toxicity ==
The β-glycosidic bond between glucose and the hydroxyl group at C5 on the pyrimidine ring are hydrolysed to yield the aglycone of vicine, divicine (2,6-diamino-4,5-dihydroxypyrimidine). These aglycones have a strong oxidising capacity for glutathione. In healthy individuals, this is not a problem, as glutathione can be reduced quickly enough to regenerate it. In individuals with a deficiency for glucose 6-phosphate dehydrogenase (G6PD) however, this results in haemolytic anaemia.

== Effects on animals ==
A 10 g vicine /kg diet in laying hens led to reduced feed intake, egg weight, haemoglobin levels and fertility and increased liver weights, liver glutathione levels and plasma lipid levels. A diet with comparable levels of vicine per kg in pigs showed only small effects on protein and energy digestibility.

In another study, laying and broiler hens were fed grains that were soaked for different periods of time, which partly or totally removed vicine. Hens that had had grains with vicine still in them showed a significant decrease in corpuscular haemoglobin, while the others did not.

An in vivo study in rats showed that oral administration of vicine resulted in only small reductions in glutathione concentrations and no mortality. Intraperitoneal administration however, led to a rapid decrease in glutathione followed by death because of anoxia.
