= Faba bean necrotic yellows virus =

Virus classification
- (unranked): Virus
- Realm: Monodnaviria
- Kingdom: Shotokuvirae
- Phylum: Cressdnaviricota
- Class: Arfiviricetes
- Order: Mulpavirales
- Family: Nanoviridae
- Genus: Nanovirus
- Species: Nanovirus necroflaviviciae

Species of virus

Faba bean necrotic yellows virus (FBNYV) is a nanovirus disease of legumes.

== Range ==
Algeria, Egypt, Eritrea, Ethiopia, Libya, Morocco, Sudan, Tunisia, Azerbaijan, Iran, Iraq, Jordan, Lebanon, Pakistan, Syria, Turkey, Yemen, Spain and Balearic Islands.

== Genome ==
FBNYV is one of the circular Rep-encoding ssDNA viruses, and so shares the characteristics of circular genome, replication initiation by Rep proteins, ssDNA composition. Replication is presumed to occur through the rolling circle replication (RCR) process. Vega-Rocha et al. 2007 disclose the structure of the FBNYV Rep's HUH endonuclease domain.

== Virulence factors ==
FBNYV produces the small protein Clink which binds to SKP1 and Prb proteins in plants. Timchenko et al. 2006 demonstrate that Clink is not necessary to produce symptoms in Vicia faba in laboratory conditions. However they do find it to be highly conserved, 98% of successfully infected plants testing positive for Clink DNA. Timchenko conclude it must be favourably selected in some way. They further speculate that in wild Vicia Clink may be required for infection because binding to SKP may be part of FBNYV's process of selective degradation of host proteins, and this may be necessary for infection of these crop wild relatives in a manner not necessary when attacking V. faba.

== Vectors ==
FBNYV is vectored by Acyrthosiphon pisum, Aphis craccivora and Aphis fabae.
