= Frederick J. Beutler =

American engineer and mathematician

- Occupations: Mathematician, engineer, and academic

Academic background
- Education: MIT (S.B., S.M.); Caltech (Ph.D.)
- Thesis: A generalization of Weiner optimum filtering and prediction (1957)
- Doctoral advisor: Charles Raymond De Prima

Academic work
- Institutions: University of Michigan
- Doctoral students: Keith W. Ross

Frederick J. Beutler is a mathematician, engineer, and academic. He is a professor emeritus at the University of Michigan.

Beutler's research interests have included information theory, electrical engineering, and applied mathematics, with a focus on stochastic processes, signal processing, optimization of complex systems, and queueing theory. He is a life fellow of the Institute of Electrical and Electronics Engineers (IEEE).

== Early life and education ==
Beutler was born on October 3, 1926, in Berlin. He was the first child of physicians Alfred David Beutler and Käthe (Italiener) Beutler. His family emigrated to the United States in 1936. He completed his S.B. and S.M. degrees from the Massachusetts Institute of Technology in 1949 and 1951, respectively. Later in 1957, he earned his Ph.D. from the California Institute of Technology. His doctoral dissertation, A generalization of Weiner optimum filtering and prediction, was supervised by Charles Raymond De Prima.

== Career ==
From 1951 to 1954, Beutler was a research engineer at the Autonetics Division of North American Aviation (NAA). Subsequently, he worked as a consultant for Ramo-Wooldridge Corp and Lockheed Aircraft until 1957.

At the University of Michigan, Beutler was an assistant professor of Aeronautical Engineering from 1957 to 1959, associate professor of Instrumentation from 1959 to 1963, professor of Instrumentation from 1963 to 1967, and professor of Information and Control Engineering between 1967 and 1990. Later, he chaired the Computer Information and Control Engineering Program for two distinct periods, from 1970 to 1971 and again from 1977 to 1990. In 1984, he was appointed as a professor of Electronics Engineering and Computer Science, and from the following year, he chaired the Electrical Engineering Systems Graduate Program, positions he held until 1990. Since then, he has been a professor emeritus of Electrical Engineering and Computer Science, as well as of Information and Control Engineering. He was the managing editor for the SIAM Journal on Applied Mathematics from 1968 to 1973.

== Research ==
By employing Hilbert space approaches, Beutler showed that perfect reconstruction is attainable for sampling systems with a variation from equal sample intervals of less than 22% and also determined generalizations for other sampling patterns. He has established a rigorous basis for stationary point processes, elucidated their properties, and studied their applications to communication and control. Another body of his work has addressed pseudoinverses, extending them to bounded linear Banach space with closed ranges. Beutler's research on queuing networks led to new results related to optimization of control and service systems.

== Personal life ==
Beutler married Abigail Elaine Caplan in 1951, and they had three children: Arthur David, Kathryn Ruth, and Michael Ernest Beutler. After divorcing Abigail, he married Suzanne Armstrong Ireland in 1969. Later in his career, he worked as a photographer and exhibited his work at exhibitions, including the Ann Arbor district library.

== Awards and honors ==
- 1980 – Life Fellow, IEEE
- 1981 – Elected Member (Eminent Engineer), Tau Beta Pi

== Selected articles ==
- Beutler, Frederick J. (1961). "Sampling theorems and bases in a Hilbert space". Information and Control. 4 (2–3): 97–117. doi:10.1016/S0019-9958(61)80001-6. hdl:2027.42/32353.
- Beutler, Frederick J (1965). "The operator theory of the pseudo-inverse II. Unbounded operators with arbitrary range". Journal of Mathematical Analysis and Applications. 10 (3): 471–493. doi:10.1016/0022-247X(65)90109-5. hdl:2027.42/32075.
- Beutler, Frederick J. (1966). "Error-free recovery of signals from irregularly spaced samples". SIAM Review. 8 (3): 328–335. doi:10.1137/1008065.
- Beutler, Frederick J.; Leneman, Oscar A. Z. (1966). "The theory of stationary point processes". Acta Mathematica. 116: 159–190. doi:10.1007/BF02392816.
- Beutler, Frederick J.; Leneman, Oscar A.Z. (1968). "The spectral analysis of impulse processes". Information and Control. 12 (3): 236–258. doi:10.1016/S0019-9958(68)90327-6. hdl:2027.42/33203.
- Beutler, Frederick J (1973). "On two discrete-time system stability concepts and supermartingales". Journal of Mathematical Analysis and Applications. 44 (2): 464–471. doi:10.1016/0022-247X(73)90071-1. hdl:2027.42/33783.
- Beutler, Frederick J.; Root, William L. (1976). "The operator pseudoinverse in control and systems identification". Generalized Inverses and Applications: 397–494. doi:10.1016/B978-0-12-514250-2.50014-7.
- Dolivo, Francois B.; Beutler, Frederick J. (1976). "Recursive integral equations for the detection of counting processes". Applied Mathematics & Optimization. 3 (1): 65–71. doi:10.1007/BF02106191. hdl:2027.42/48093.
- Beutler, Frederick J.; Melamed, Benjamin (1978). "Decomposition and customer streams of feedback networks of queues in equilibrium". Operations Research. 26 (6): 1059–1072. doi:10.1287/opre.26.6.1059.
- Beutler, Frederick (1983). "Mean sojourn times in Markov queueing networks: Little's formula revisited". IEEE Transactions on Information Theory. 29 (2): 233–241. doi:10.1109/TIT.1983.1056638.
- Beutler, Frederick J.; Ross, Keith W. (1985). "Optimal policies for controlled Markov chains with a constraint". Journal of Mathematical Analysis and Applications. 112 (1): 236–252. doi:10.1016/0022-247X(85)90288-4. hdl:2027.42/25498.
