= Beutler test =

- Synonyms: Fluorescent spot test
- Purpose: used to identify enzyme defect

The Beutler test, also known as the fluorescent spot test, is a screening test used to identify enzyme defects.

== Uses ==
It can be used in screening for:

- galactosemia
- glucose-6-phosphate dehydrogenase deficiency
