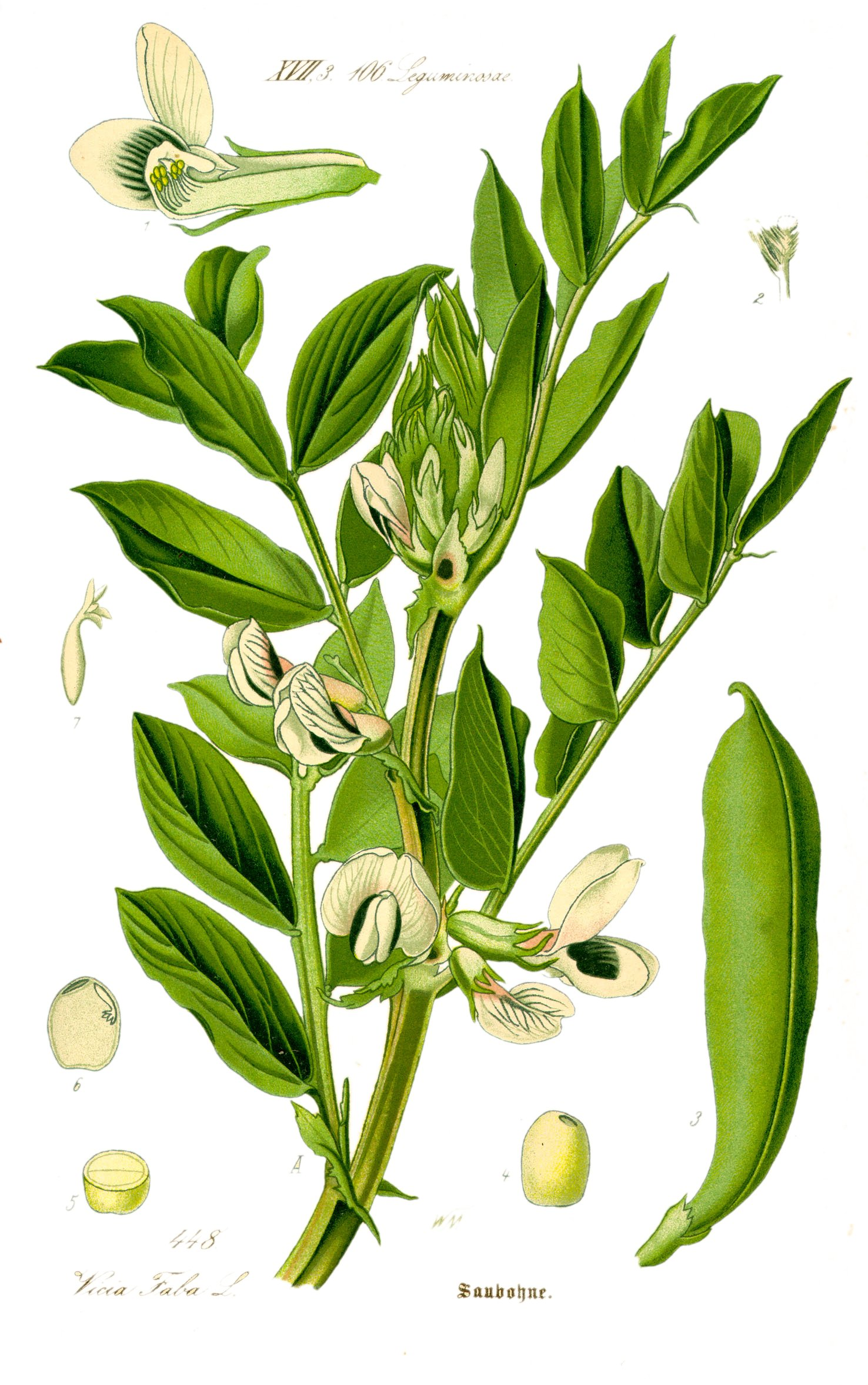
- Illustration of Vicia faba in flower

Scientific classification
- Kingdom: Plantae
- Clade: Tracheophytes
- Clade: Angiosperms
- Clade: Eudicots
- Clade: Rosids
- Order: Fabales
- Family: Fabaceae
- Subfamily: Faboideae
- Genus: Vicia
- Species: V. faba

Binomial name
- Vicia faba L.

Synonyms
- Faba sativa Moench.

= Vicia faba =

Broad bean

Species of plant in the pea and bean family

Vicia faba, commonly known as the broad bean, fava bean, or faba bean, is a species of vetch, a flowering plant in the pea and bean family Fabaceae. It is widely cultivated as a crop for human consumption, and also as a cover crop. Varieties with smaller, harder seeds that are fed to horses or other animals are called field bean, tic bean or tick bean. This legume is commonly consumed in many national and regional cuisines.

Some people have favism, a hemolytic response to the consumption of broad beans, a condition linked to a metabolic disorder known as G6PDD. Otherwise the beans, with the outer seed coat removed, can be eaten raw or cooked. With young seed pods, the outer seed coat can be eaten, and in very young pods, the entire seed pod can be eaten.

== Description ==
Vicia faba is a stiffly erect, annual plant 0.5 to 1.8 metres (1 1/2 to 6 ft) tall, with two to four stems that are square in cross-section. The leaves are 10 to 25 centimetres (4 to 10 in) long, pinnate with 2–7 leaflets, and glaucous (grey-green). Unlike most other vetches, the leaves do not have tendrils for climbing over other vegetation.

The flowers are 1 to 2.5 cm (1/2 to 1 in) long with five petals; the standard petals are white, the wing petals are white with a black spot (true black, not deep purple or blue as is the case in many "black" markings) and the keel petals are white. Crimson-flowered broad beans also exist, which were recently saved from extinction. The flowers have a strong sweet scent which is attractive to bees and other pollinators.

The fruit is a broad, leathery pod that is green, but matures to a dark blackish-brown, with a densely downy surface; the wild species has pods that are 5 to 10 cm (2 to 4 in) long and 1 cm diameter, but many modern cultivars developed for food use have pods 15 to 25 cm (6 to 10 in) long and 2–3 cm thick. Each bean pod contains 3–8 seeds. They are round to oval and have a 5–10 mm diameter in the wild plant, but are usually flattened and up to 20–25 mm long, 15 mm broad and 5–10 mm thick in food cultivars. V. faba has a diploid (2n) chromosome number of 12 (six homologous pairs). Five pairs are acrocentric chromosomes and one pair is metacentric.

=== Genome ===
The diploid genome of Vicia faba contains 13 GB of DNA, mostly obtained through amplification of retrotransposons and satellite repeats. The genome is one of the largest diploid field crops and contains a predicted 34,221 protein-coding genes.

== Cultivation ==
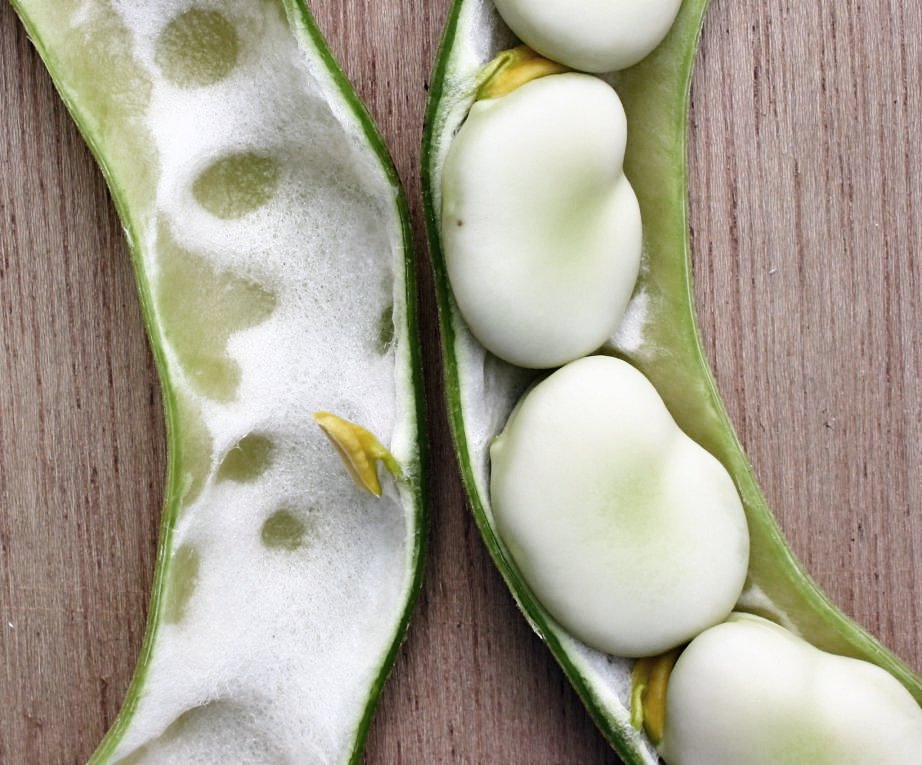
Broad beans in the pod

Broad beans have a long tradition of cultivation in Old World agriculture, being among the most ancient plants in cultivation and also among the easiest to grow. While their wild ancestor has not been identified and their origin is unknown, charred legumes of a possible wild-type progenitor have been identified at the Natufian site of the el-Wad Terrace. Carbonised domestic faba bean remains were discovered at three adjacent Neolithic sites in Israel's Lower Galilee (Yiftah'el, Ahi'hud and Nahal Zippori). Based on the radiocarbon dating of these remains, scientists now believe that the domestication of the crop may have begun as early as 8250 BCE.

Broad beans are still often grown as a cover crop to prevent erosion because they can overwinter and, as a legume, they fix nitrogen in the soil. The broad bean has high plant hardiness; it can withstand harsh and cold climates. Unlike most legumes, the broad bean can be grown in soils with high salinity, as well as in clay soil. However, it prefers rich loams.

In much of the English-speaking world, the name "broad bean" is used for the large-seeded cultivars grown for human food, while "horse bean" and "field bean" refer to cultivars with smaller, harder seeds that are more like the wild species and used for animal feed, though their stronger flavour is preferred in some human food recipes, such as falafel. The name "broad bean" is the most common name in Commonwealth countries like the UK, Canada, Australia and New Zealand, while the term "fava bean" (from Italian: fava for the bean) is used in the United States.

Production of broad beans

Broad bean yield

== Pests and diseases ==
Many diseases appear at a higher rate in higher humidity. Therefore, cultivars being bred for higher density should be evaluated for disease problems. This can be mitigated by west–east rows for more sun drying effect.

Disease tolerance is an important part of breeding V. faba.

If transplanted instead of direct seeded there is a lower risk of some diseases including Botrytis fabae.

=== Parasites ===
In mainland Europe and North Africa, the plant parasite Orobanche crenata (carnation-scented broomrape) can cause severe impacts on fields of broad beans, devastating their yields.

=== Fungal diseases ===
==== Botrytis fabae ====
Vicia faba is attacked by Botrytis fabae, the chocolate spot fungus, which can have a severe impact on yield. It is one of the worst diseases in broad beans, as it results in foliar damage, reduced photosynthesis, and reduced bean productivity. The fungus switches from non-aggressive growth to aggressive pathogenicity under the combination of increased temperature and humidity, which is worsened by low soil potassium and phosphorus content and by the higher humidity caused by higher seeding rates. The non-aggressive phase is marked by small red-brown leaf lesions, and sometimes the same on stems and pods. Treatment is less effective than prevention. Early planting avoids the problematic combination of high temperature and humidity in late spring into early summer. Decreasing seeding rate or thinning after emergence is also effective. Foliar fungicide is effective. If broad beans flower during the height of summer temperatures there is an increased risk of this disease. If transplanted instead of direct seeded there is a lower risk of Botrytis fabae outbreaks.

==== Erysiphe spp. ====
Powdery mildew species such as Erysiphe baeumleri are not uncommon on Vicia species. Resistant cultivars and overhead irrigation are preventative. Sulfur fungicides are recommended in severe outbreaks.

==== Fusarium solani ====
This soil borne pathogen is mitigated by lower temperature, aeration, drainage, and sufficient nutrition. Symptoms include stunting, yellowing, necrotic basal leaves, and brown or red or black streak-shaped root lesions that grow together and may show above the soil as the disease progresses.

==== Uromyces viciae-fabae var. viciae-fabae ====
Faba bean rust is a fungal pathogen commonly affecting broad bean plants at maturity, causing small orange dots with yellow halos on the leaves, which may merge to form an orange lawn on both leaf surfaces.

==== Sclerotinia stem rot ====
Both Sclerotinia sclerotiorum and S. trifoliorum are pathogens of interest. Lithourgidis et al. have done extensive work over the years, including in 2007 for S. t., 2005 for S. s., and 1989 regarding procedures for field testing with S. s.

=== Bacterial diseases ===
==== Xanthomonas campestris and X. axonopodis ====
Xanthomonas campestris and X. axonopodis can be inoculated by seed contamination and by overwintering in crop residue. Increased incidence with higher temperatures, rainfall, and humidity. Produces deliquescent, necrotic lesions, sometimes with a wider yellow lesion around them, and in advanced disease the plant will look burned. Can be prevented or treated by use of uninfected seed, resistant cultivars, seed treatments, and copper bactericides.

==== Pseudomonas syringae ====
Pseudomonas syringae overwinters on residue. Uninfected seed, rotation, and removal of residue are preventative.

=== Viral diseases ===
Faba bean necrotic yellows virus which it shares with other Vicia. Timchenko et al. 2006 find the protein Clink is not obviously necessary but highly conserved nonetheless, suggesting it is maintained by necessity for infection of other Vicia.

=== Insect pests ===
==== Aphis fabae ====
Broad bean plants are highly susceptible to early summer infestations of the black bean aphid, which can cover large sections of growing plants with infestations, typically starting at the tip of the plant. Severe infestations can significantly reduce yields, and can also cause discolouration of pods and reduction in their saleable values.

Aphis fabae is a major pest. May infest transplants. Reflective plastic mulch may be preventative. May be mechanically removed by high pressure water once plant is established. V. faba is tolerant to low and medium degrees of infestation, so insecticide application is only required under high infestation.

== Toxicity ==
Beans generally contain phytohaemagglutinin, a lectin that occurs naturally in plants, animals, and humans. Most of the relatively low toxin concentrations found in V. faba can be destroyed by boiling the beans for 10 minutes.

Broad beans are rich in levodopa, and should thus be avoided by those taking irreversible monoamine oxidase inhibitors to prevent a pressor response.

=== Genetic predisposition ===
Sufferers of favism must avoid broad beans, as they contain the alkaloid glycoside vicine which may initiate a hemolytic crisis. A low-content vicine-convicine faba bean line was identified in the 1980s and the trait has been introduced into several modern cultivars. Low vicine-convicine faba beans are safe for consumption by G6PD-deficient individuals. As of 2019, a molecular marker may be used for marker-assisted breeding to reduce levels of vicine-convicine in broad beans.

Broad beans, mature seeds, raw
Nutritional value per 100 g (3.5 oz)
- Energy: 340 kcal (1,400 kJ)
- Carbohydrates: 58.29 g
- Dietary fibre: 25 g
- Fat: 1.53 g
- Protein: 26.12 g
Vitamins and minerals
| Vitamins | Quantity %DV^{†} |
| Thiamine (B1) | 46% 0.555 mg |
| Riboflavin (B2) | 26% 0.333 mg |
| Niacin (B3) | 18% 2.832 mg |
| Vitamin B6 | 22% 0.366 mg |
| Folate (B9) | 26% 104 μg |
| Vitamin C | 2% 1.4 mg |
| Vitamin K | 8% 9 μg |
| Minerals | Quantity %DV^{†} |
| Calcium | 8% 103 mg |
| Copper | 92% 0.824 mg |
| Iron | 37% 6.7 mg |
| Magnesium | 46% 192 mg |
| Manganese | 71% 1.626 mg |
| Phosphorus | 34% 421 mg |
| Potassium | 35% 1062 mg |
| Selenium | 15% 8.2 μg |
| Sodium | 1% 13 mg |
| Zinc | 29% 3.14 mg |
- Other constituents: Quantity
- Water: 11 g
- ^{†}Percentages estimated using US recommendations for adults, except for potassium, which is estimated based on expert recommendation from the National Academies.

== Uses ==
=== Culinary ===
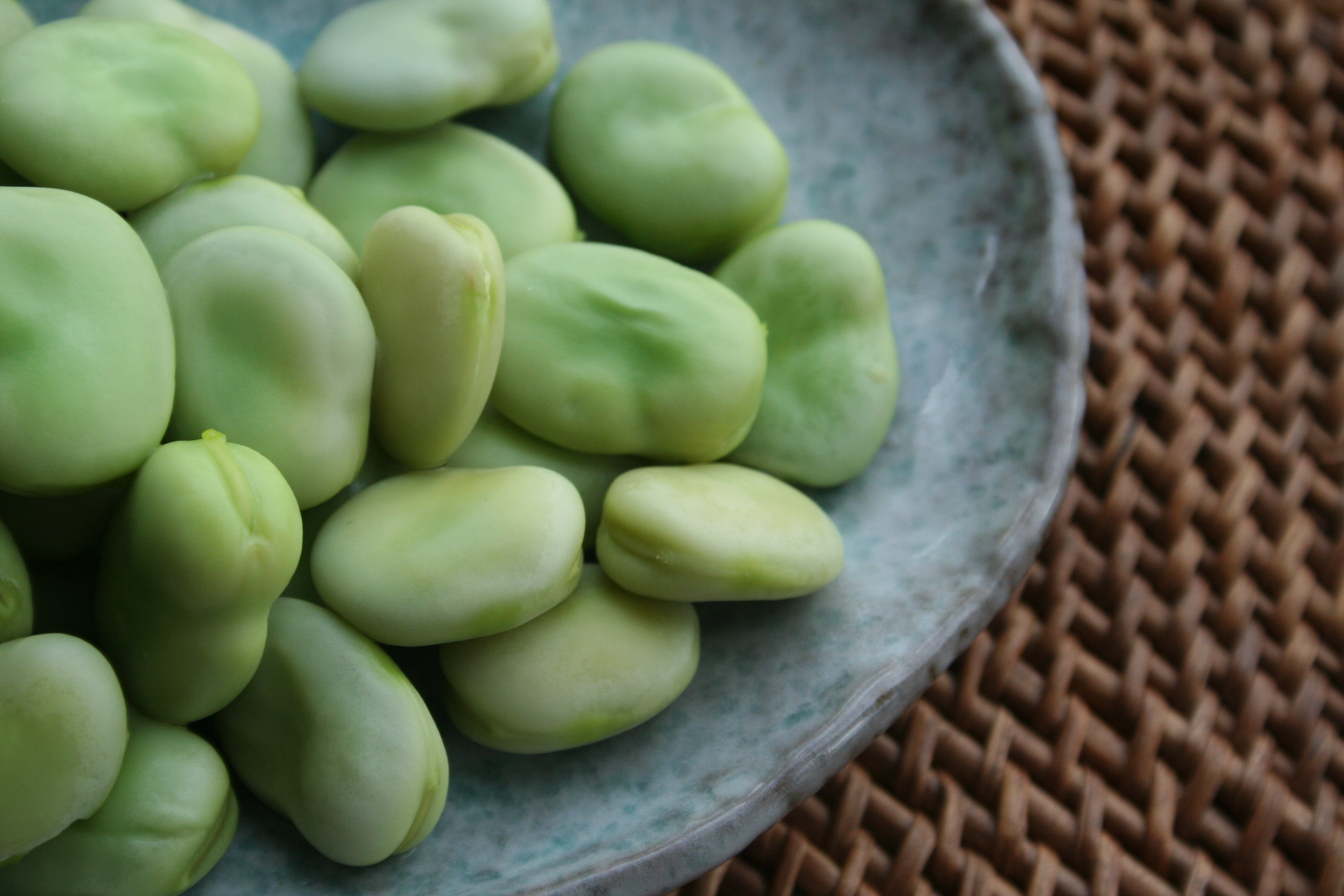
Broad beans, shelled and steamed

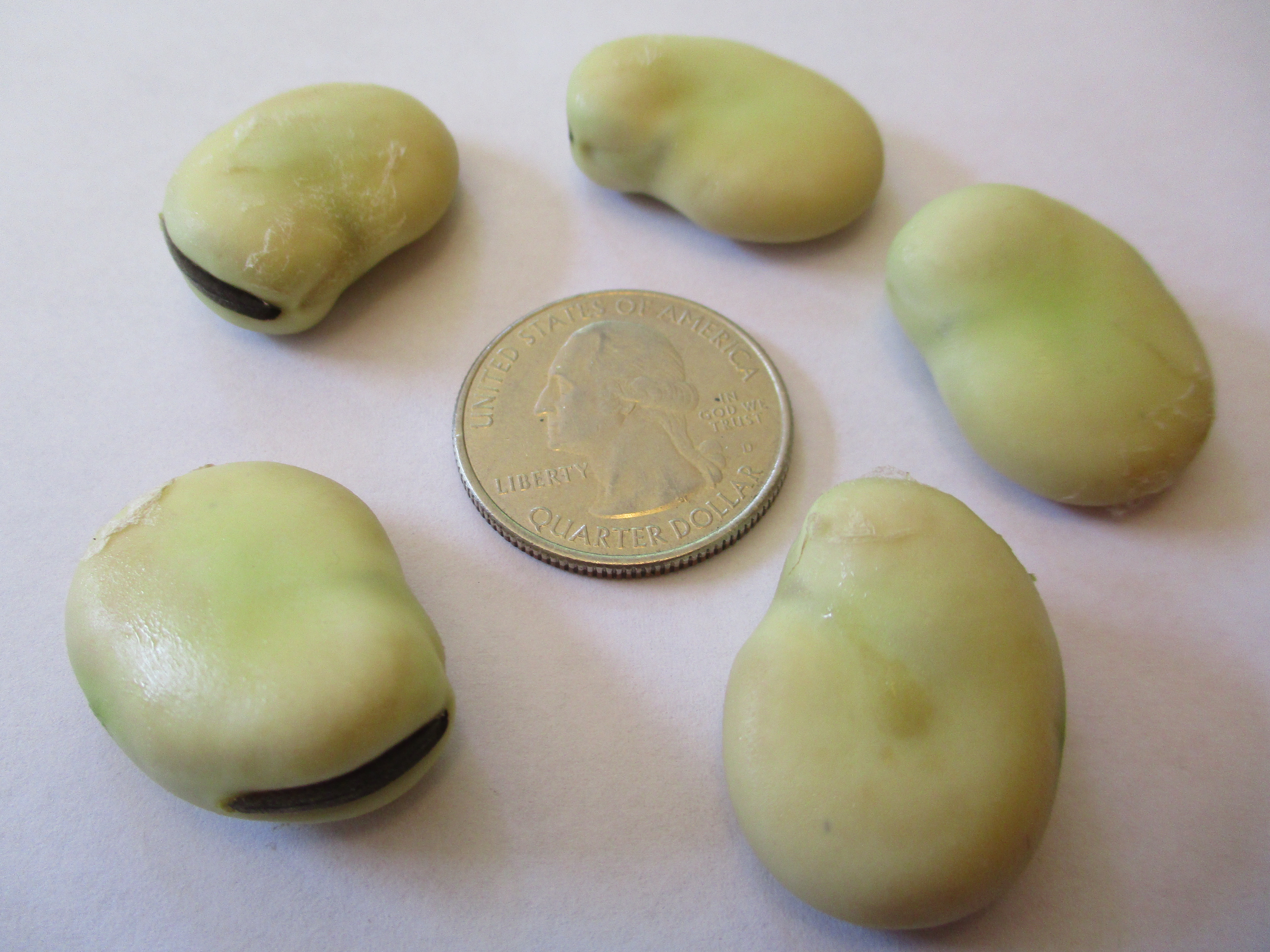
Vicia faba beans around a US quarter

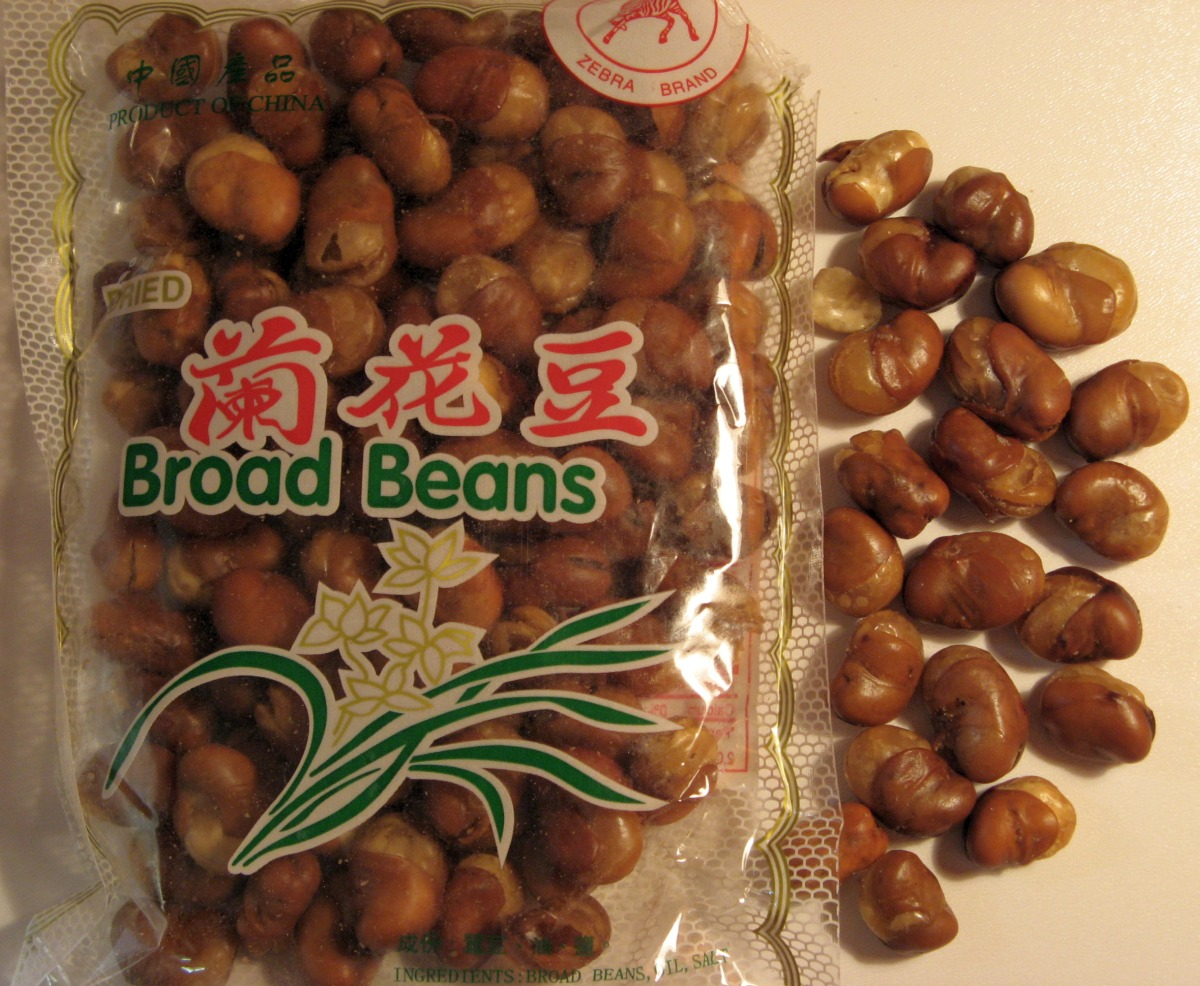
Fried broad beans as a snack

Raw mature broad beans are 11% water, 58% carbohydrates, 26% protein, and 2% fat. A 100-gram reference amount supplies 1,425 kJ (341 kcal; 341 Cal) of food energy and numerous essential nutrients in high content (20% or more of the Daily Value, DV). Folate (26% DV), and dietary minerals, such as manganese, phosphorus, magnesium, and iron (range of 52–77% DV), have considerable content. B vitamins have moderate to rich content (19–48% DV). Broad beans present the highest protein-to-carbohydrate ratio among other popular pulse crops, such as chickpea, pea and lentil. Moreover, their consumption is recommended along with cereals as both foods are complementary in supplying all essential amino acids.

Broad beans are generally eaten while still young and tender, enabling harvesting to begin as early as the middle of spring for plants started under glass or overwintered in a protected location, but even the main crop sown in early spring will be ready from mid to late summer. Horse beans, left to mature fully, are usually harvested in the late autumn, and are then eaten as a pulse. The immature pods are also cooked and eaten, and the young leaves of the plant can also be eaten, either raw or cooked as a pot herb (like spinach).

Preparing broad beans involves first removing the beans from their pods, then steaming or boiling the beans, either whole or after parboiling them to loosen their exterior coating, which is then removed. The beans can be fried, causing the skin to split open, and then salted and/or spiced to produce a savory, crunchy snack.

==== Algeria ====
In south Algerian cuisine, broad beans are used to make besarah and doubara. Doubara is popular in the city of Biskra.

==== China ====
In the Sichuan cuisine of China, broad beans are combined with soybeans and chili peppers to produce a spicy fermented bean paste called doubanjiang.

==== Colombia ====
Broad beans (Colombia: Haba(s)) are a common food in most regions of Colombia, mostly in Bogota and Boyacá.

==== Ecuador ====
Steamed broad beans (known as habitas) with cheese is common in the cold-weather regions of Ecuador, especially around the Andes mountains and surroundings of Ambato.

==== Egypt ====
Broad beans (Egyptian Masri: fūl pronounced [fuːl]) are a common staple food in the Egyptian diet, eaten by rich and poor alike. Egyptians eat broad beans in various ways: they may be shelled and then dried, or bought dried and then cooked in water on very low heat for several hours. They are the primary ingredient in Egyptian-style falafel (unlike the Levantine style, where the primary ingredient is chickpeas). The most popular way of preparing them in Egypt is by taking the cooked and partially mashed beans and adding oil, salt, and cumin to them. The dish, known as ful medames, is traditionally eaten with bread (generally at breakfast) and is considered one of Egypt's national dishes.

==== Ethiopia ====
Broad beans (Amharic: baqella) are one of the most popular legumes in Ethiopia. They are tightly coupled with every aspect of Ethiopian life. They are mainly used as an alternative to peas to prepare a flour called shiro, which is used to make shiro wot (a stew used widely in Ethiopian dishes). During the fasting period in the Ethiopian Orthodox Church tradition called Tsome Filliseta, Tsome arbeå, Tsome Tahsas, and Tsome Hawaria (which are in August, end of February, April, mid-November, beginning of January, and June–July), two uncooked spicy vegetable dishes are made using broad beans. The first is hilibet, a thin, white paste of broad bean flour mixed with pieces of onion, green pepper, garlic, and other spices. The second is siljo, a fermented, sour, spicy thin yellow paste of broad bean flour. Both are served with other stews and injera (a pancake-like bread) during lunch and dinner.

Baqella nifro (boiled broad beans) are eaten as a snack during some holidays and during a time of mourning. This tradition goes well into religious holidays, too. On the Thursday before Good Friday (in the Ethiopian Orthodox Church tradition, tselote hamus (the Prayer of Thursday)), people eat a different kind of nifro called gulban. Gulban is made of peeled half-beans collected and well-cooked with other grains such as wheat, peas, and chickpeas.

==== England ====
In England, broad beans are usually boiled.

There is a project aimed at increasing broad bean consumption, particularly by use of broad bean flour in bread.

==== Finland ====
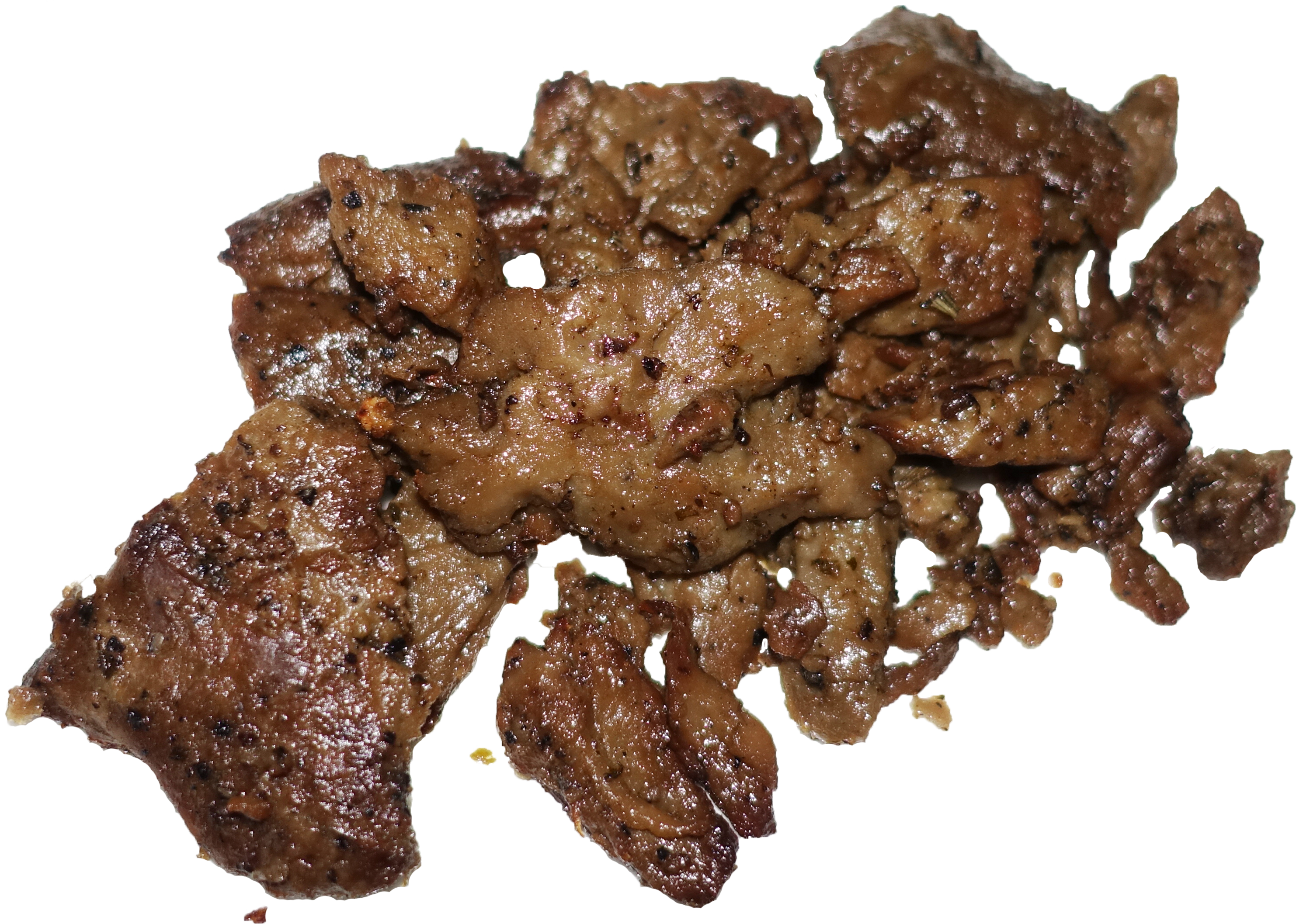
Härkis

In Finnish, the word for "broad bean" is härkäpapu (literally "ox bean"). Broad beans are used to make a meat substitute called Härkis.

==== Greece ====
The Greek word fáva (φάβα) does not refer to broad beans, but to the yellow split pea and also to another legume, Lathyrus clymenum. Broad beans are known instead as koukiá (Greek: κουκιά), and are eaten in a stew combined with artichokes, while they are still fresh in their pods. Dried broad beans are eaten boiled, sometimes combined with garlic sauce (skordalia).

In Crete, fresh broad beans are shelled and eaten as a companion to tsikoudia, the local alcoholic drink.

Favism is quite common in Greece because of malaria endemicity in previous centuries, and people afflicted by it do not eat broad beans.

==== India ====
In India, broad beans are eaten in the Northeastern state of Manipur. They are locally known as hawai-amubi and are ingredients in the dish eromba.

==== Iran ====
Broad beans, or "Baghalee" (Persian: باقالی) are primarily cultivated in the central and north parts of Iran. The city of Kashan has the highest production of broad beans with high quality in terms of the taste, cooking periods and colour. However, broad beans have a very short season (roughly two weeks). The season is usually in the middle of spring. When people have access to fresh beans in season, they cook them in brine and then add vinegar and Heracleum persicum depending on taste. They also make an extra amount to dry to be used year-round. The dried beans can be cooked with rice, which forms one of the most famous dishes in north of Iran (Gilan) called baghalee polo (Persian: باقالی پلو) which means "rice with broad beans". In Iran, broad beans are cooked, served with Golpar-origan and salt and sold on streets in the winter. This food is also available preserved in metal cans.

==== Iraq ====
Broad beans which are called Bagilla (باگله/باقله) in the Iraqi dialect of Arabic are a common ingredient in many Iraqi foods. One of the most popular Iraqi dishes that uses the broad bean is Bagilla Bil-Dihin (باگله بالدهن) also called Tishreeb Bagilla (تشريب باگله). This dish is a common breakfast dish in Iraq and consists of bread soaked in boiled broad beans' water then topped with broad beans, melted Ghee, and often also a boiled or fried egg. Fool (فول) is another common breakfast dish in Iraq as well as many other Arab countries and consists of mashed broad beans. Another famous Iraqi dish is Timmen Bagilla (تمن باگله), which is Arabic for 'broad bean rice'. This classic Iraqi dish consists of rice cooked with broad bean and dill.

==== Italy ====
In Sardinia, broad beans are traditionally cooked with lard, often substituted or paired with bacon or minced pork.

In Rome, broad beans are popular either cooked with guanciale or with globe artichokes, as side dish together with lamb or kid, or raw with pecorino romano. Fave e pecorino is the traditional dish for 1 May picnic in Liguria, Tuscany, Marche, Umbria and Latium.

In Sicily, maccu is a Sicilian soup prepared with broad beans as a primary ingredient.

In Apulia, broad bean purée with wild chicory is a typical dish.

==== Japan ====
Broad beans, called soramame (Japanese: そら豆, lit: "sky bean"), are consumed in a variety of ways in Japan. Most commonly, the beans are boiled and are eaten straight or added to rice. It is also consumed as a popular snack called ikarimame (Japanese: いかり豆, lit: "anchor bean"), in which the beans are roasted or fried.

==== Luxembourg ====
Judd mat Gaardebounen, or smoked collar of pork with broad beans, is the national dish of Luxembourg.

==== Malta ====
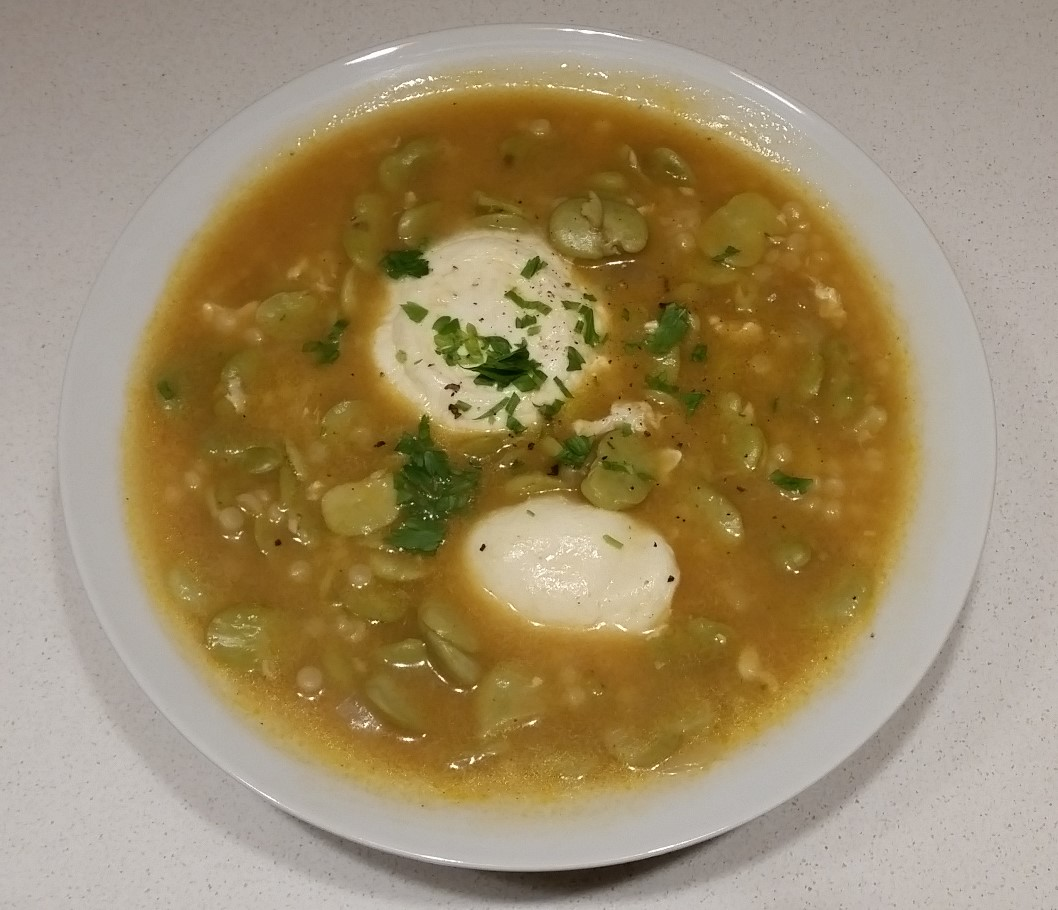
Maltese kusksu

They are a primary ingredient of the Maltese kusksu, a vegetable soup primarily containing broad beans and pasta beads. They are also used in an appetizer called bigilla where they are served as a pureé mixed with olive oil, lemon juice, garlic, parsley and mint. It is served with bread or crackers.

==== Mexico ====
In Mexico, broad beans are often eaten in a soup called sopa de habas, meaning "broad bean soup". They are also eaten fried, salted, and dried, as a snack, either by themselves or in combination with other salted, dried beans and nuts.

==== Morocco ====
In Morocco, broad beans are cooked, steamed or made into tabiṣart, a dip sold as a street food and commonly eaten in winter.

==== Nepal ====
In Nepal, broad beans are called bakulla. They are eaten as a green vegetable when the pods are young, generally stir-fried with garlic. When dried, broad beans are eaten roasted, or mixed with other legumes, such as moong beans, chick peas, and peas, and called qwati. The mixture, soaked and germinated, is cooked as soup and consumed with rice or beaten rice on the occasion of Janai Purnima also known as Rakshya Bandhan, a festival celebrated by the Hindus. The dry and stir-fried version of qwati is called biraula. The qwati soup is believed to reinvigorate the body affected by monsoon paddy season.

==== Netherlands ====
In the Netherlands, they are traditionally eaten with fresh savory and some melted butter. The combination of the beans tossed with crispy fried bacon is also common. When rubbed, the velvet insides of the pods are a folk remedy against warts.

==== Peru ====
Broad beans (Peruvian Spanish: haba(s)) are eaten fresh or dry-toasted, boiled, roasted, stewed or in soup. Habas are one of the essential ingredients of pachamanca in the Andes of Peru, and are also an additive for panetela, a homemade remedy to keep children fed and hydrated in cases of diarrhea or stomach infection and for cholera treatment.

Peruvian dishes with broad beans include:

- Aji de habas
- Saltado de habas
- El chupe de habas
- Ajiaco de papas y habas
- Pachamanca
- Guiso de habas
- Shambar (heavy soup, traditional in Trujillo)

==== Poland ====
In Poland, fava beans are frequently served boiled as a seasonal snack, usually from June to July. The pods are discarded. The individual beans are typically (though not always) peeled at the time of consumption.

==== Portugal ====
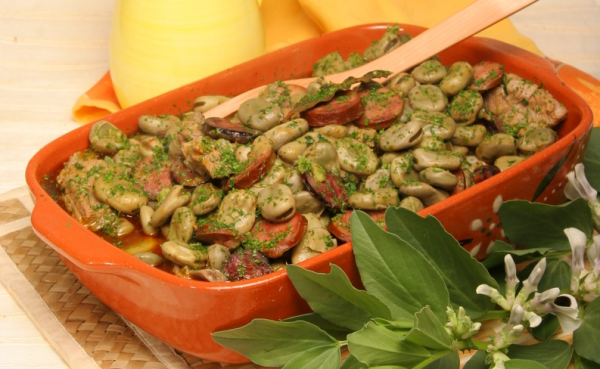
"Favas guisadas à Portuguesa", a Portuguese broad bean stew

Broad beans (Portuguese: favas) are widely cultivated in Portugal and are very popular throughout the country. The most popular dish cooked with favas is "favada", a stew with onion and pork—depending on the region of the country the pork may be chorizo, bacon, pork shoulder, ribs or the mixture of many of these. In Alentejo a lot of coriander will be added in the end. Besides favada, broad beans may be served dry and fried as an appetiser.

==== Serbia ====
Broad bean aspic (Serbian: bobove pihtije) is a Serbian winter dish in which the pureed cooked beans are combined with crushed garlic and set in a mould, topped with ground paprika in hot oil.

==== Spain ====
Broad beans (Spanish: habas) are widely cultivated in Spain. Culinary uses vary among regions, but they can be used as the main pulse in a stew (Habas estofadas, michirones) or as an addition to other dishes (menestra, paella). In certain regions they can be eaten while unripe or fried and packaged as a snack.

==== Sudan ====
Broad beans are one of the most widely consumed foods in Sudan. For most Sudanese, especially for city dwellers, they form the main dish during breakfast time (fatoor). The beans are cooked by steadily boiling over a sustained period of time. Similar to Egypt, the cooked beans are mashed, and prepared by adding salt and chili pepper and cumin. For additional flavour, sesame oil is added along with a sprinkling of jibna ("feta" cheese) on top. The dish is then eaten with bread, sometimes mixed all in one dish: this is called fatta. Boash, the cooking liquid or aquafaba, is also eaten, often mixed in with bread as a fatta.

==== Sweden ====
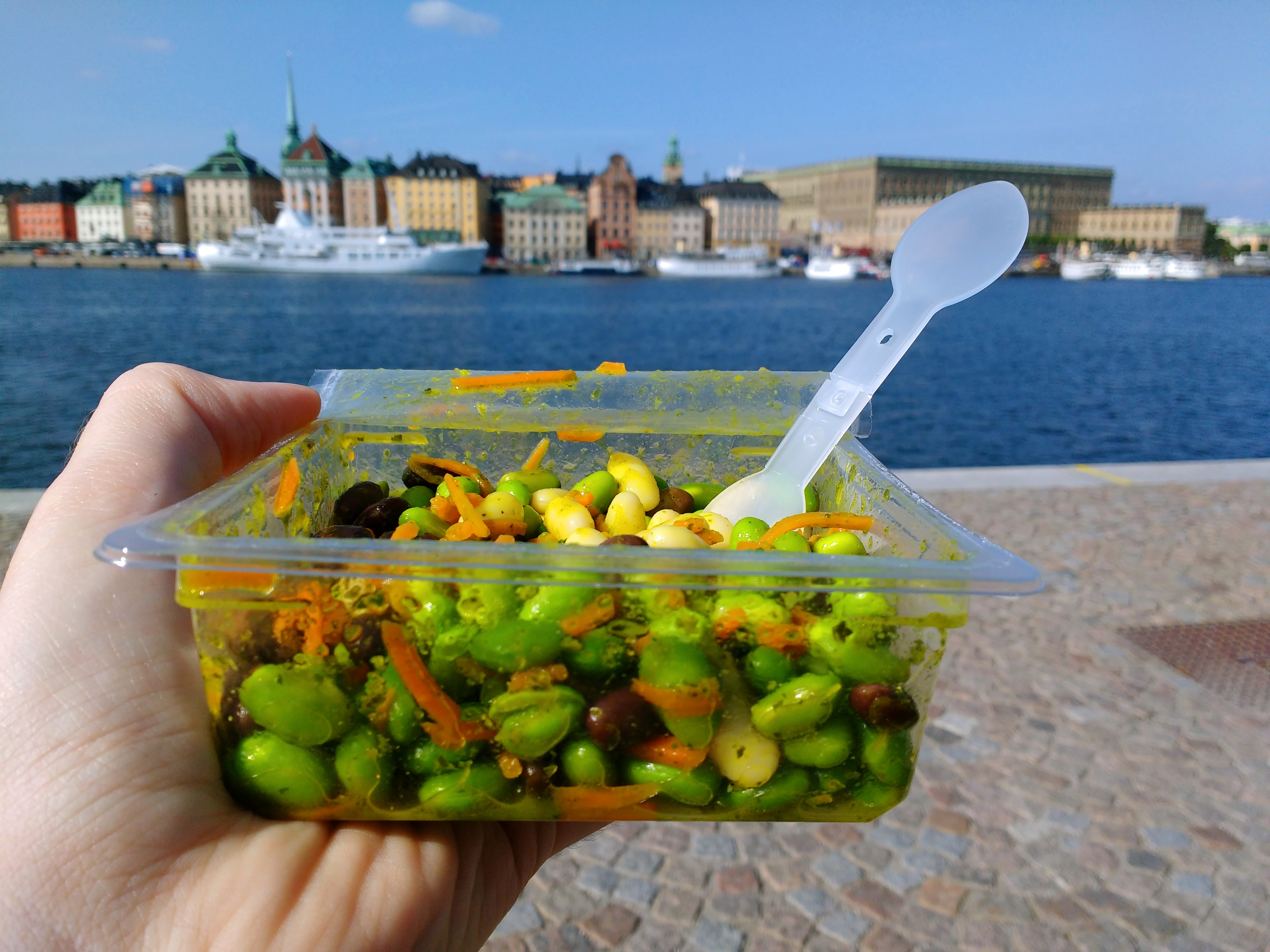
Green broad bean vegan salad in Sweden

Broad beans (Swedish: bondbönor, lit. 'peasant beans'), which in Sweden were traditionally eaten as soaked brown, and boiled, dried broad beans fried in lard, were for a very long time popular to add to other foods as a filling side, specially with fried pork. The green, raw, and lightly boiled broad beans were used seasonally as a side green.

==== Syria ====
In Syria, broad beans are prepared in multiple ways for breakfast, lunch or dinner. Ful medames is the same as the Egyptian dish (it is not mashed though) but with the addition of tomato, parsley and onion and with olive oil. Another version of it includes the addition of tahini (sesame paste), olive oil, garlic and lemon. For lunch, broad beans are cooked with a mix of minced and big chunks of meat and is topped on white rice and eaten with cold yogurt and cucumber salad. Bulgur is sometimes used in preparing this recipe instead of rice. Broad beans are cooked with pieces of garlic, meat and meat stock with the addition of lemon juice and cilantro. This dish is called foulieh and is eaten on the side with rice. The same recipe is prepared without meat as a vegan dish eaten on Lent by Christians in Syria.

==== Turkey ====
In Turkey, broad beans are called bakla. This is also the name of a zeytinyağlı dish made by simmering young and tender broad bean pods with chopped onions in olive oil. It is traditionally garnished with dill and served cool, together with yoghurt. Another dish is fava, a meze prepared by pureeing beans with olive oil. Broad beans are also cooked with artichoke (enginarlı iç bakla), which is another zeytinyağlı dish.

==== Vietnam ====
In Southern Vietnam, broad beans (đậu móng heo) are usually stir fried with rice noodles, durians, shrimps, Thai basil, quail eggs and pig intestines in a dry stew called hủ tiếu lòng heo.

=== Other uses ===
- In ancient Greece and Rome, beans were used in voting; a white bean was used to cast a yes vote, and a black bean for no. Even today, the word koukia (κουκιά) is used unofficially, referring to the votes. Beans were used as a food for the dead, such as during the annual Lemuria festival.
- The ancient Roman family name Fabius and the modern political term Fabian derive from this particular bean.
- Both Porphyry and Iamblichus report that Pythagoras once persuaded a bull not to eat beans.
- In Ubykh culture, throwing beans on the ground and interpreting the pattern in which they fall was a common method of divination (favomancy), and the word for "bean-thrower" in that language has become a generic term for seers and soothsayers in general.
- The colloquial expression 'not worth a hill of beans' alludes to their widespread economy and association with the peasant diet.
- In Italy, broad beans are traditionally sown on 2 November, All Souls Day. Small cakes made in the shape of broad beans (though not out of them) are known as fave dei morti or "beans of the dead". According to tradition, Sicily once experienced a failure of all crops other than the beans; the beans kept the population from starvation, and thanks were given to Saint Joseph. Broad beans subsequently became traditional on Saint Joseph's Day altars in many Italian communities. Some people carry a broad bean for good luck; some believe that if one carries a broad bean, one will never be without the essentials of life. In Rome, on the first of May, Roman families traditionally eat fresh broad beans with Pecorino Romano cheese during a daily excursion in the Campagna. In northern Italy, on the contrary, broad beans are traditionally fed to animals—and so some people, especially the elderly, might frown on human consumption. But in Liguria, a maritime region near northern Italy, broad beans are loved raw, and consumed fresh in early spring as the first product of the garden, alone or with fresh Pecorino Sardo or with local salami from Sant'Olcese. In some Central Italian regions, a once-popular and recently rediscovered fancy food is the bagiana, a soup of fresh or dried broad beans seasoned with onions and beet leaves stir-fried, before being added to the soup, in olive oil and lard (or bacon or cured ham fat).
- In Portugal and Spain a Christmas cake called bolo Rei in Portuguese and roscón de reyes in Spanish (King's cake) is baked with a broad bean inside. Whoever eats the slice containing it, is supposed to buy next year's cake.
- A similar tradition exists in France, where the fève (originally a dried bean, but often now a small china or metal trinket) is placed in the galette des rois; the person who finds it in their slice becomes the king or queen of the meal, and is often expected to serve the other guests to drink.
- Pliny claimed they acted as a laxative.
- European folklore also claims that planting beans on Good Friday or during the night brings good luck.
- Frederick E Rose (London) Ltd v William H Pim Junior & Co Ltd [1953] 2 QB 450, is an English contract law case where the two litigants had both mistaken feveroles for ordinary horse beans.
- Can be used as a green manure, due to nitrogen fixation it produces.
- In the Netherlands, roasted or fried broad beans are regarded as a local delicacy of the city of Groningen, and is locally called molleboon. Until the 1800s, the city council used mollebonen for the voting process, sometimes real beans, sometimes made of stone or clay. The word Molleboon became a nickname for the inhabitants of the city.

== Research ==
The first experimental demonstration that the pattern of replication of eukaryotic chromosomes follows the semiconservative DNA replication scheme proposed in 1953 by Watson and Crick was reported in 1957 using V. faba root cells.

== Gallery ==
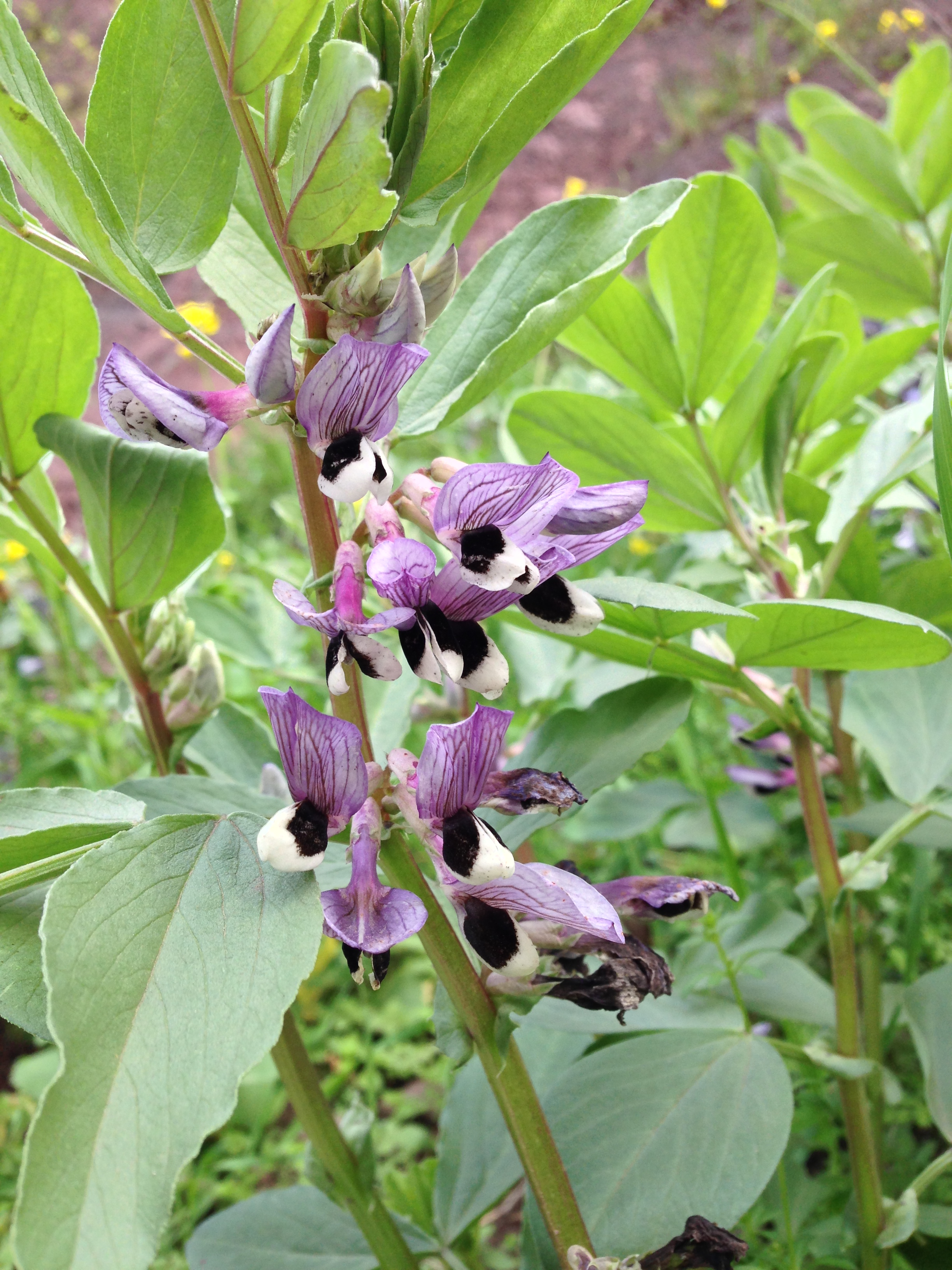
Broad bean flowers

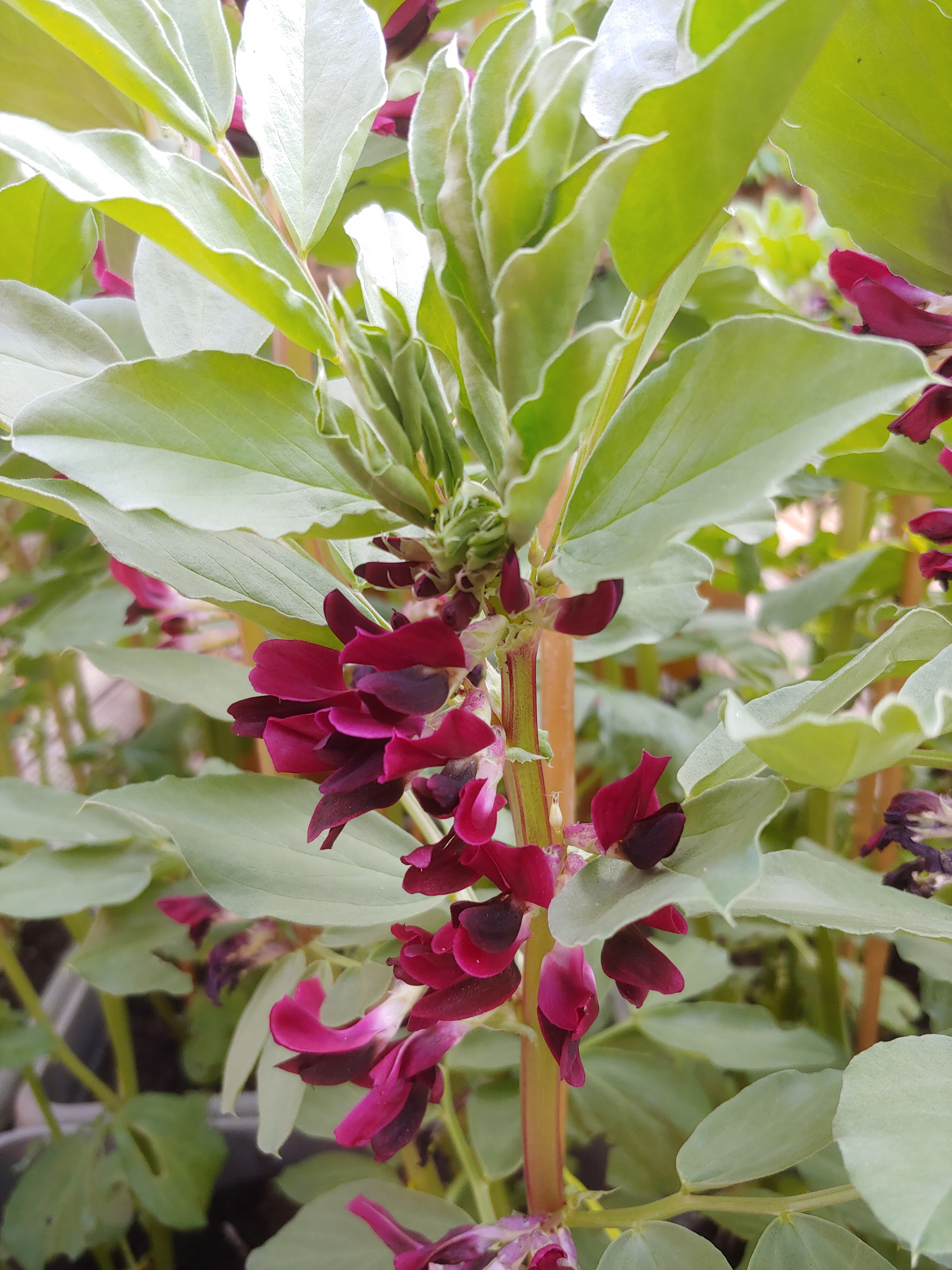
Crimson flowered broad beans

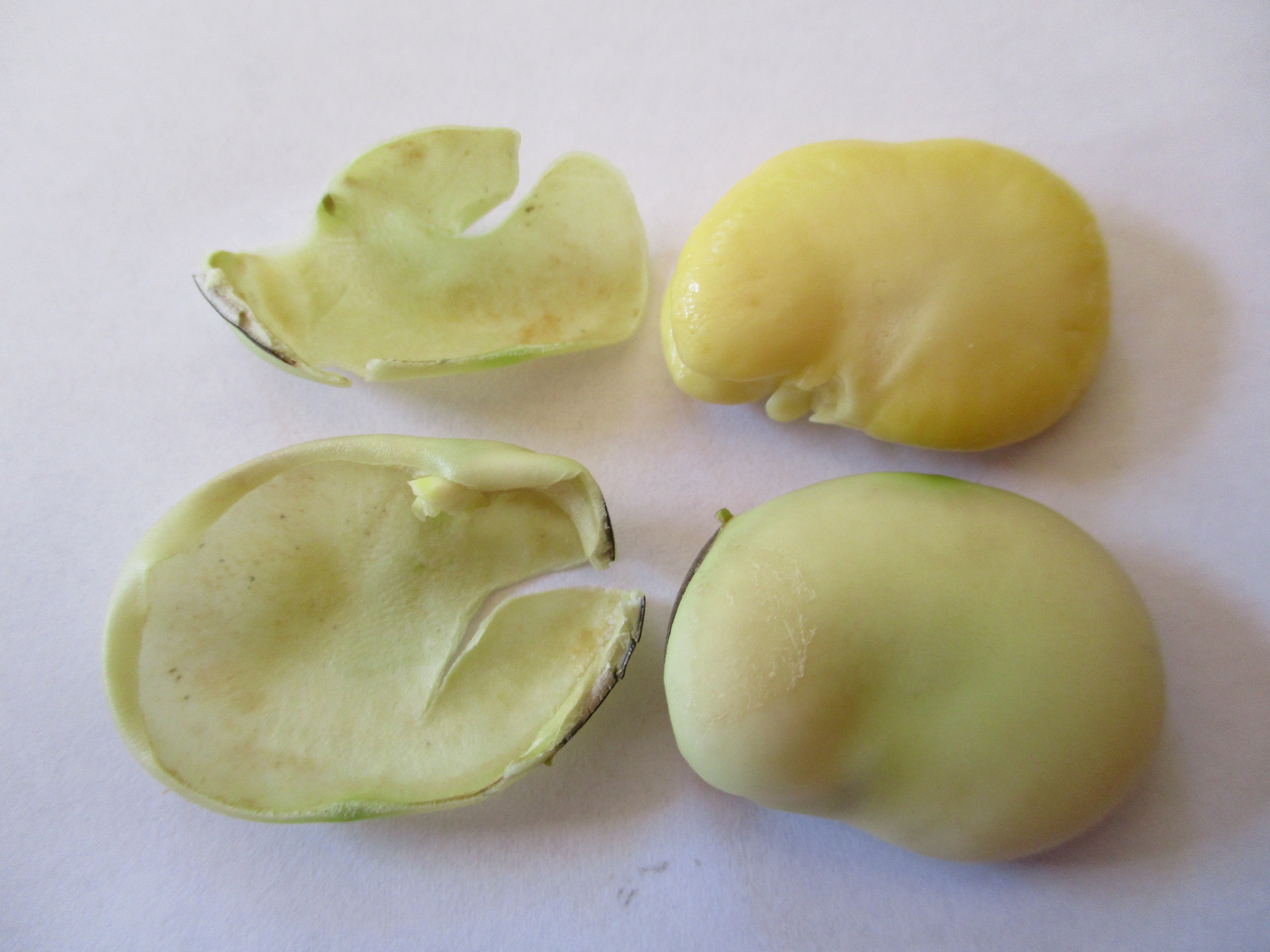
Seed of raw broad bean removed and set next to intact seed

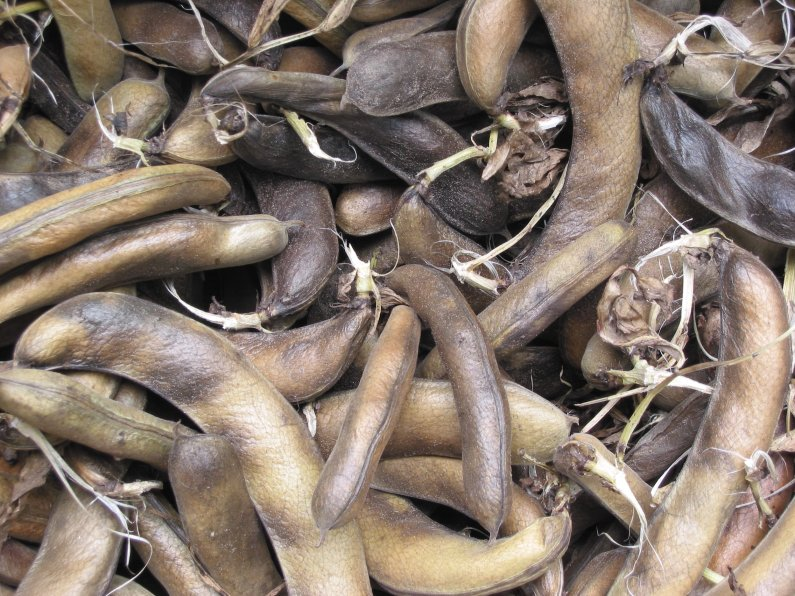
Mature broad bean pods

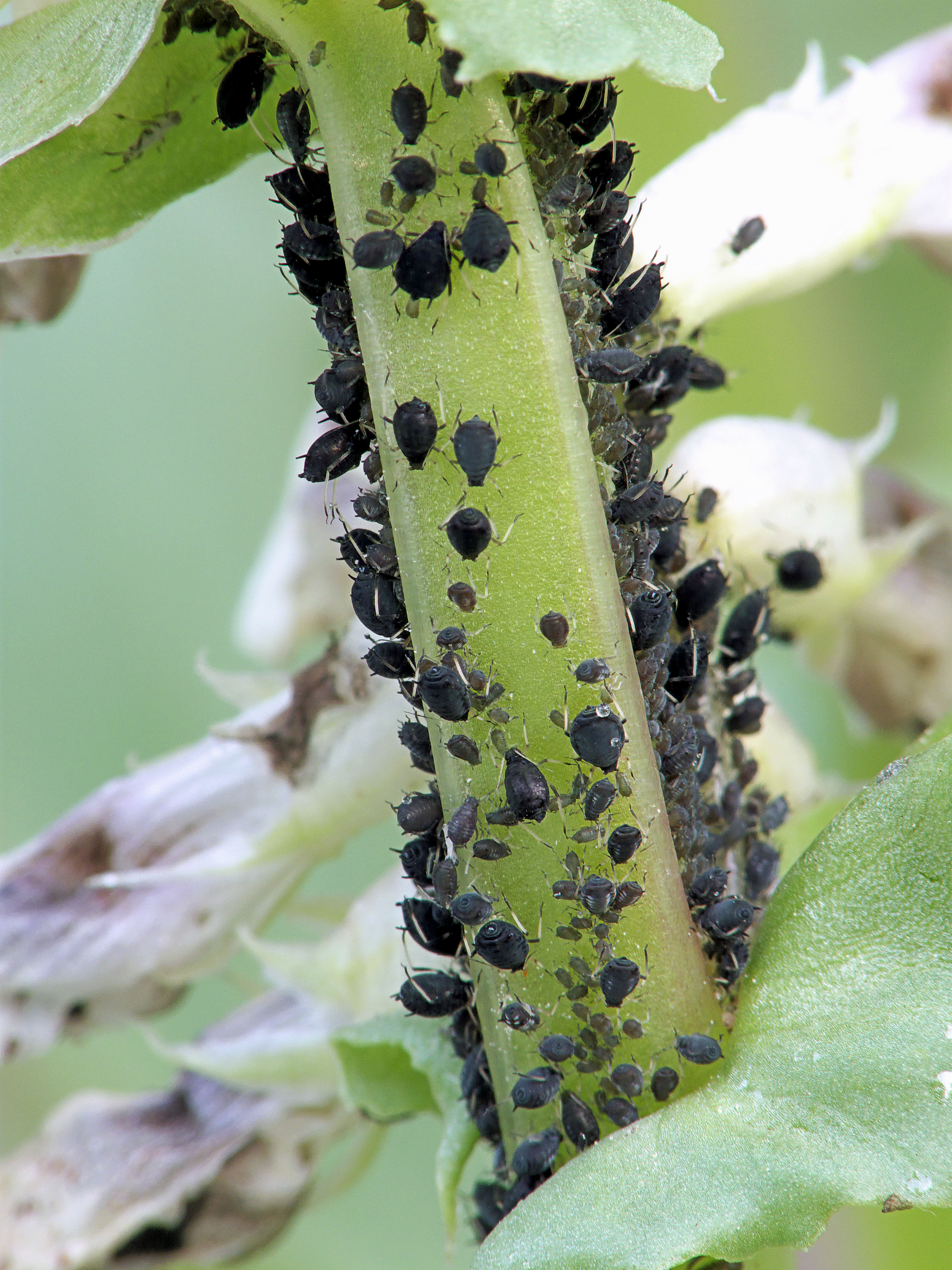
Aphis fabae (aphids) on broad bean

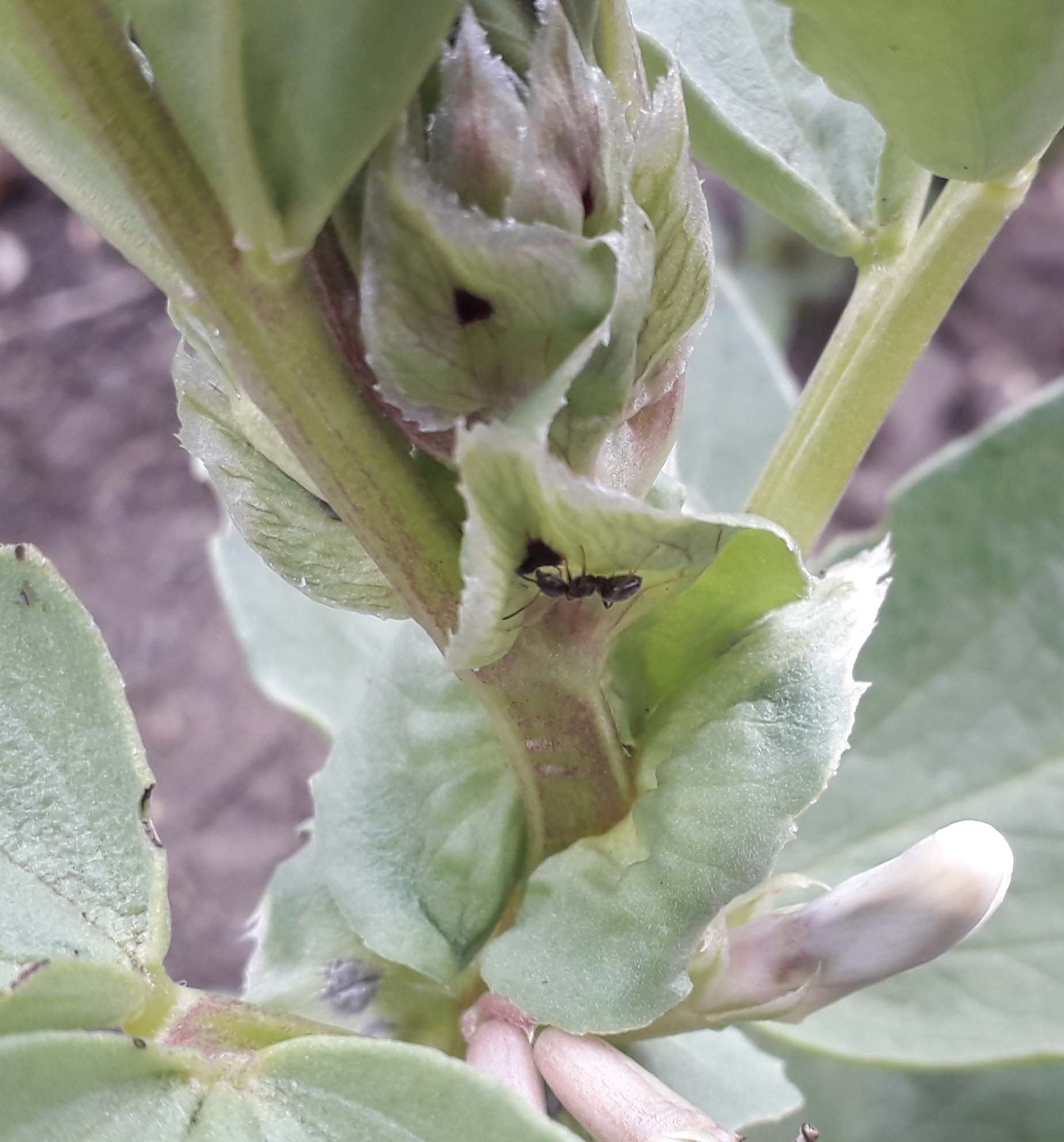
Lasius niger attending an extrafloral nectary

== See also ==
- Phytoremediation plants – Decontamination technique using living plants
  - List of hyperaccumulators
- List of edible seeds
