= Ernst H. Beutner =

American microbiologist (1923–2013)

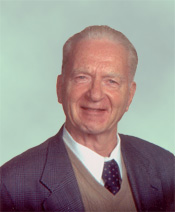
Beutner in 2012

Ernst H. Beutner (August 27, 1923 – June 10, 2013) was a German-born microbiologist who discovered the role of autoimmunity in pemphigus and pemphigoid using self-designed immunofluorescent methods. For this achievement, he is often regarded as the "Founder of Immunodermatology". He was the author or co-author of over 10 papers, which were each cited over 100 times.

== Personal life ==
In 1923, Beutner immigrated to the United States at 8 weeks old with his parents, Hermine Aye and Dr. Reinhard Beutner. He married V. Gloria Parks in 1949. He received his PhD in microbiology from the University of Pennsylvania in 1951. He was board certified by the American Board of Medical Microbiology, the American Board of Medical Laboratory, and the American Board of Bioanalysis in 1975, 1979, and 1983, respectively. He died on June 10, 2013.

== Scientific career ==
Upon graduation he took positions at the Brooke Hospital and Harvard Dental School. In 1956 he accepted a position on the faculty of the University of Buffalo in the Department of Bacteriology and Immunology under the leadership of Ernest Witebsky. Initially, Beutner conducted his studies with a group of UB medical students, including Robert E. Jordon, MD ’65, and Burton Chertock, MD ’67. Jordon's father, James Jordon, MD, who headed the Division of Dermatology at UB, had suggested that Beutner's group study the role of autoimmunity in pemphigus vulgaris (PV). Over the course of the next few years they discovered evidence that both PV and bullous pemphigoid (BP) are autoimmune diseases. Currently, Beutner is a Professor Emeritus of Microbiology, Immunology & Dermatology of the University of Buffalo. Their discovery continues to define the diagnostic “gold standard” for these diseases, as well as for dermatitis herpetiformis. He received the 2003 American Society of Dermapathology "Founders Award" for his role in developing the field of immunodermatology.

=== Publications ===
In 1971, he served as Secretary General for a New York Academy of Science congress in Stockholm on “Defined immunofluorescent staining” and for its congress on “Defined Immunofluorescence and related Cytochemical Methods” in Niagara Falls, NY in 1982. The conference annals edited by E.H. Beutner, R. Nisengard and B. Albin (2) focused on the reproducible detections antinuclear antibodies (ANA) with fluorescein labeled antibodies to human IgG.

Beutner and his associates, notably . Tadeusz Chorzelski and his mentor Stefania Jablonska (who chaired the Dermatology Department in Warsaw, Poland), edited four books on the immunopathology of the skin. Immunopathology of the skin by Ernst H. Beutner, Tadeusz P. Chorzelski, Vijay Kumar - Wiley (1987); Autoimmunity in psoriasis by Ernst H. Beutner - CRC Press (1982); Serologic Diagnosis of Celiac Diseases by Tadeusz P. Chorzelski, Vijay Kumar, Ernst H. Beutner, Tadeusz Zalewski; Immunopathology of the Skin: Labeled Antibody Studies by Ernst H. Beutner; Dowden, Hutchinson & Ross, Incorporated; 1/1/1973

From 1971 to 1979, Beutner and his associates held an annual seminar on the diagnosis of disease through immunofluorescent methods.

=== ANA standards ===
Beutner established the first proficiency tests for ANA in United States as a consultant for the studies of Roger Taylor at the Center for Disease Control. His studies revealed that most commercial ANA kits and none of the “in house” tests yielded reproducible results. Based on those results, ANA testing standards were developed and mandated by Federal law for all diagnostic laboratories that perform ANA tests and manufacturers of ANA kits including labeled antibodies used in such tests. Due to the standard practices, ANA tests are now one of the criteria of the American Rheumatism Association for the Diagnosis of the lupus erythematosus.

=== Immunofluorescent techniques ===
Today, pemphigus, pemphigoid, and psoriasis, which were of unknown etiology, are now diagnosed worldwide by immunofluorescent studies of blood serum and/or biopsies of skin or affected mucous membranes. Immunodermatology methods reveal normal autoantibodies that react in psoriatic scales and relevant cellular responses.

== Beutner Labs ==
In 1992 Ernst founded Beutner Labs, Inc. a diagnostic skin immunopathology center that specializes in immunologic tests for the diagnosis of bullous, vascular, connective tissue and inherited skin diseases.
