= 5,6-Dihydroxycytosine =

Names
- Preferred IUPAC name 6-Amino-5-hydroxypyrimidine-2,4(1H,3H)-dione
- Other names 6-Amino-2,4,5-trihydroxypyrimidine

Identifiers
CAS Number	3914-34-9
3D model (JSmol)	Interactive image
ChemSpider	69925
PubChem CID	77518
UNII	RHK5WK6LJN
CompTox Dashboard (EPA)	DTXSID90192387
- InChI: InChI=1S/C4H5N3O3/c5-2-1(8)3(9)7-4(10)6-2/h8H,(H4,5,6,7,9,10) Key: SPOYOCCBDWULRZ-UHFFFAOYSA-N
- SMILES: c1(c([nH]c(=O)[nH]c1=O)N)O

Properties
Chemical formula	C_{4}H_{5}N_{3}O_{3}
Molar mass	143.102 g·mol^{−1}
- Except where otherwise noted, data are given for materials in their standard state (at 25 °C [77 °F], 100 kPa). Infobox references

5,6-Dihydroxycytosine (Isouramil) can be formed from treatment of DNA with osmium tetroxide.
