= Mallard complex =

The mallard complex refers to closely linked members of the Anas genus found around the world thought to all be descended from one common ancestor. Species in the mallard complex are known for frequent hybridization amongst other members of the complex. The species within the complex can be very difficult to distinguish genetically, likely due to either hybridization, the retention of ancestral genetic variation or both. The phenotypes of mallard complex ducks, particularly the "mallardine" species can be difficult to distinguish due to hybridization, backcrossing and the possible retention of ancestral genetic variation giving species a trait they would not usually have. The American black duck (Anas rubripes), for instance may have double white bars above and below the speculum due to either the retention of ancestral genetic material or due to gene flow from the mallard (Anas platyrhynchos). Among North American members of the complex, using genetic data sets (with over 3000 loci), researchers assigned individuals to their taxonomic groups. They were also able to observe the amount of gene flow between particular species and variants. The movement of genetic information into another species population has long been a worry for conservationists as some species may lose much of their genetic purity. Particularly to species such as the Mexican duck (Anas diazi) due to its limited population and range.

== Retention of ancestral genetic variation ==
The retention of ancestral genetic variation can be caused by incomplete lineage sorting (ILS) and introgression after secondary contact. These two factors can cause genetic variation to be shared between closely related species which is possibly why an American black duck or a mottled duck (Anas fulvigula) may have notable white on its speculum or a Mexican duck may have flecks of green. It's possible that these rarer phenotypes within select members of the complex are not a result of mallard gene flow but instead ancestral genetic variation.

== Gene flow findings ==
- Mexican duck gene flow into mottled ducks of the Gulf coast subspecies (all variants)
- Black ducks gene flow into mottled ducks (all variants)
- Mallard gene flow into black ducks (autosomal, non-outlier variants)
- Mallard gene flow into Mexican ducks (Z-linked variants)

== Hybridization within the mallard complex ==
All the species within the mallard complex are known to hybridize with other members within overlapping ranges. Mallards, both domestic and wild in particular are notorious hybridizers, know to frequently hybridize within the mallard complex and even outside of Anas. The willingness to hybridize has concerned conservationists as the gene flow from the mallard may pollute pure populations of more vulnerable species such as the Mexican duck. The Mexican duck, a species with a relatively small population experiences gene flow from both the mottled duck and mallards. This dilution of pure genes due to the propensity of species within the mallard complex to hybridize and backcross could cause issues for the genetic purity of the species. Backcrossing in particular can negatively impact non-mallard species as oftentimes the hybrids breed with the more vulnerable species, leading to further genetic dilution. In captivity studies with the American black duck it has been discovered that the hybrids follow Haldane's rule with hybrid females often dying before they reach sexual maturity.

== Phylogeny ==
The mallard complex is a large branch of the Anas genus consisting of twelve closely related species.

- Mexican duck (A. diazi)
- American black duck (A. rubripes)
- Mottled duck (A. fulvigula)
- Mallard (A. platyrhynchos)
- Indian spot-billed duck (A. poecilorhyncha)
- Philippine duck (A. luzonica)
- Laysan duck (A. laysanensis)
- Hawaiian duck (A. wyvilliana)
- Pacific black duck (A. superciliosa)
- Meller's duck (A. melleri)
- Yellow-billed duck (A. undulata)
- African black duck (A. sparsa)
