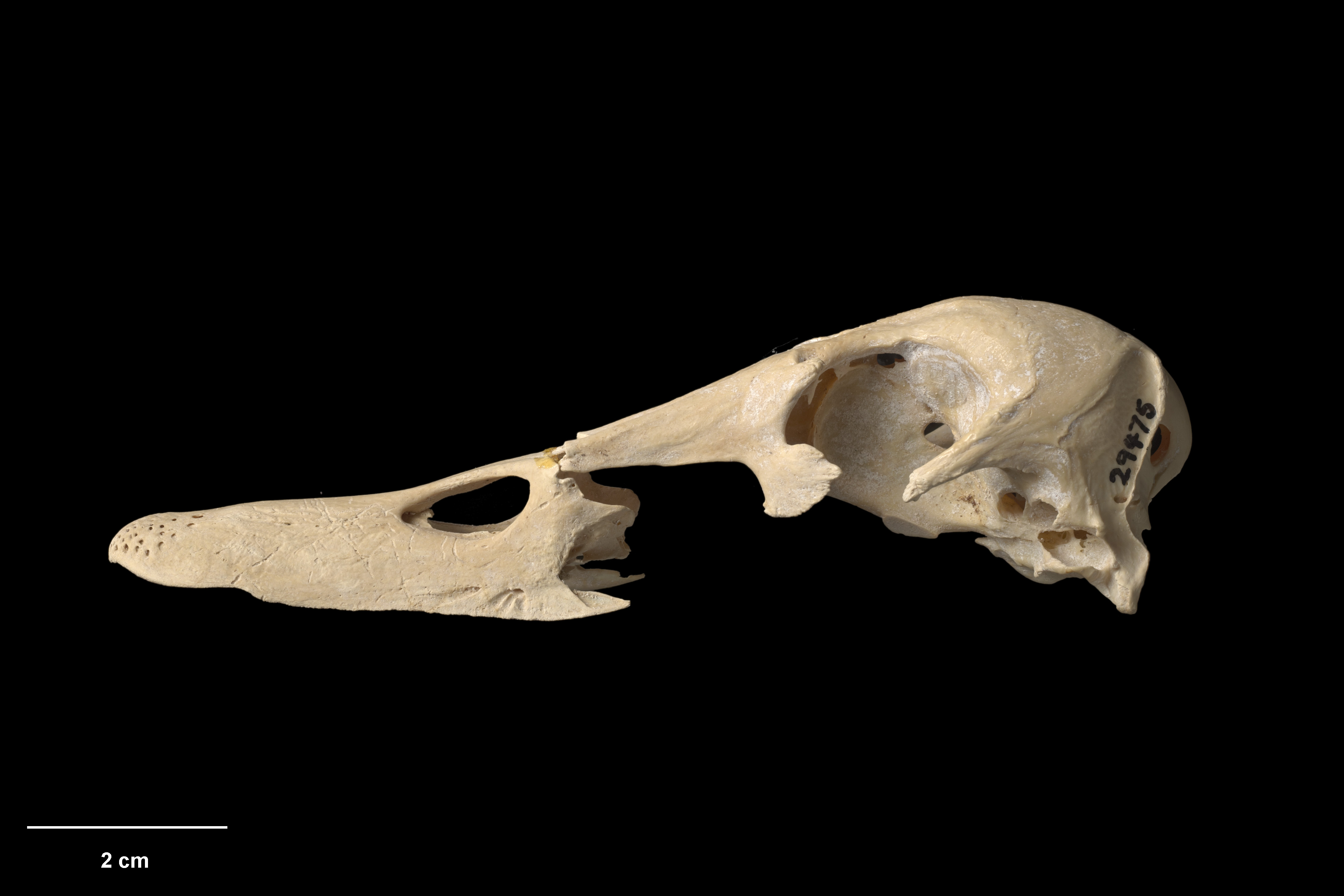
- Skull of Anas chathamica from the Te Papa collections

Conservation status
- Extinct (16th century)

Scientific classification
- Kingdom: Animalia
- Phylum: Chordata
- Class: Aves
- Order: Anseriformes
- Family: Anatidae
- Genus: Anas
- Species: †A. chathamica

Binomial name
- †Anas chathamica Oliver, 1955

= Anas chathamica =

Anas chathamica Temporal range: Late Pleistocene-Holocene

Extinct species of bird

Anas chathamica, the Chatham duck or Chatham Island duck, is an extinct species of duck which once lived in New Zealand's Chatham Islands in the south-west Pacific Ocean.

== Taxonomy ==
The species was formerly placed in a monotypic genus, Pachyanas. However, analysis of mitochondrial DNA extracted from subfossil remains showed that the Chatham duck was not, in fact, closely related to shelducks but instead belongs in the genus Anas: the dabbling ducks. Its closest living relatives appear to be the Auckland teal, Campbell teal and the brown teal from New Zealand.

== Description ==
It was described by Walter Oliver (as a "stoutly built duck") from bird bones in the collection of the Canterbury Museum in 1955 in the second edition of his work New Zealand Birds. Some authors have suggested that the Chatham duck was flightless; however, comparison of Chatham duck wing bones with those from living ducks indicates no disproportional reduction in wing length.

The species is known from a few hundred fossil bones found on the main island in the Chatham Islands group.

== Extinction ==
The species likely became extinct around the 16th century due to human hunting.
