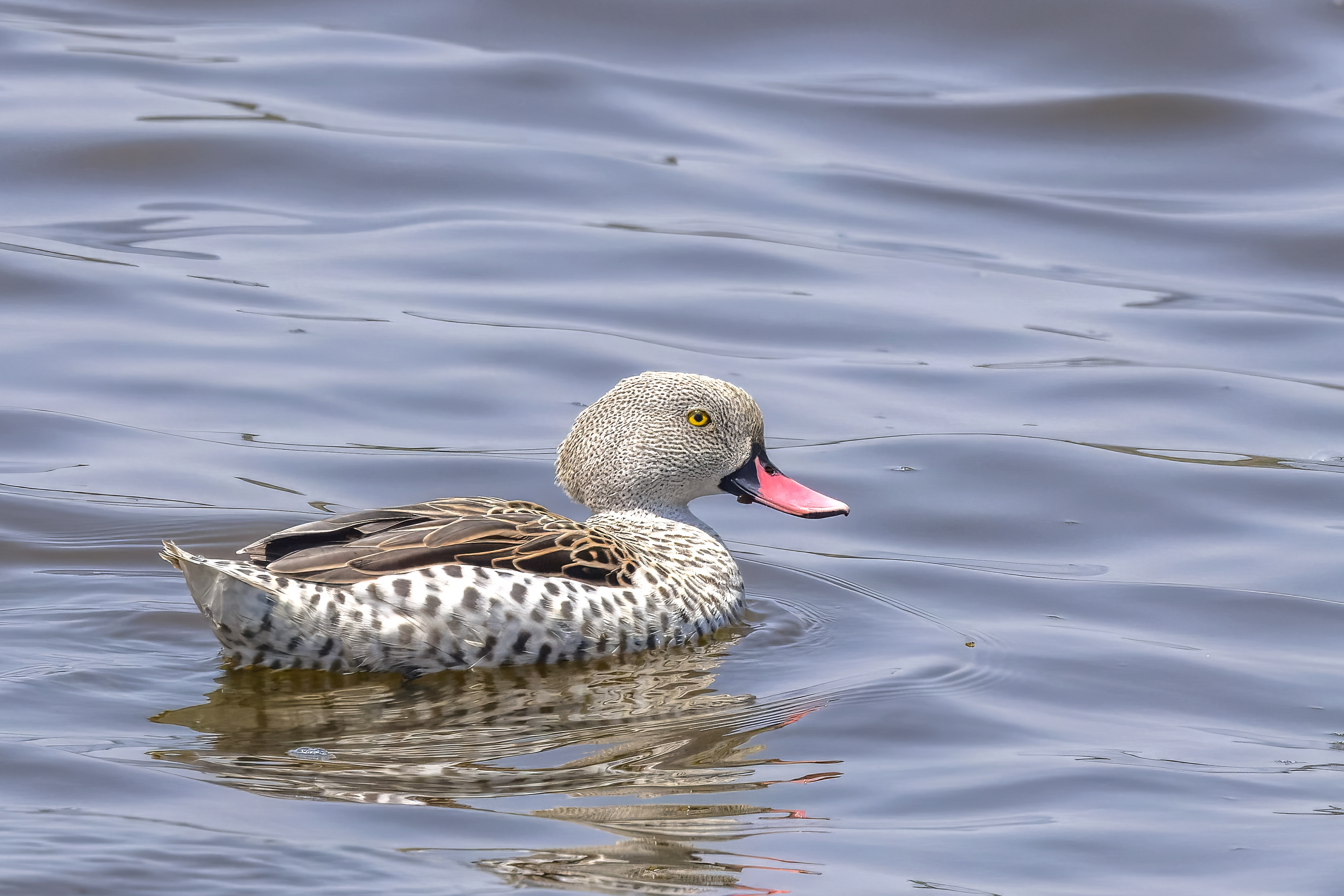

Conservation status
- Least Concern (IUCN 3.1)

Scientific classification
- Kingdom: Animalia
- Phylum: Chordata
- Class: Aves
- Order: Anseriformes
- Family: Anatidae
- Genus: Anas
- Species: A. capensis

Binomial name
- Anas capensis Gmelin, 1789

= Cape teal =

Species of bird

The Cape teal (Anas capensis) also Cape wigeon or Cape widgeon is a 44–46 cm long dabbling duck of open wetlands in sub-Saharan Africa.

== Taxonomy ==
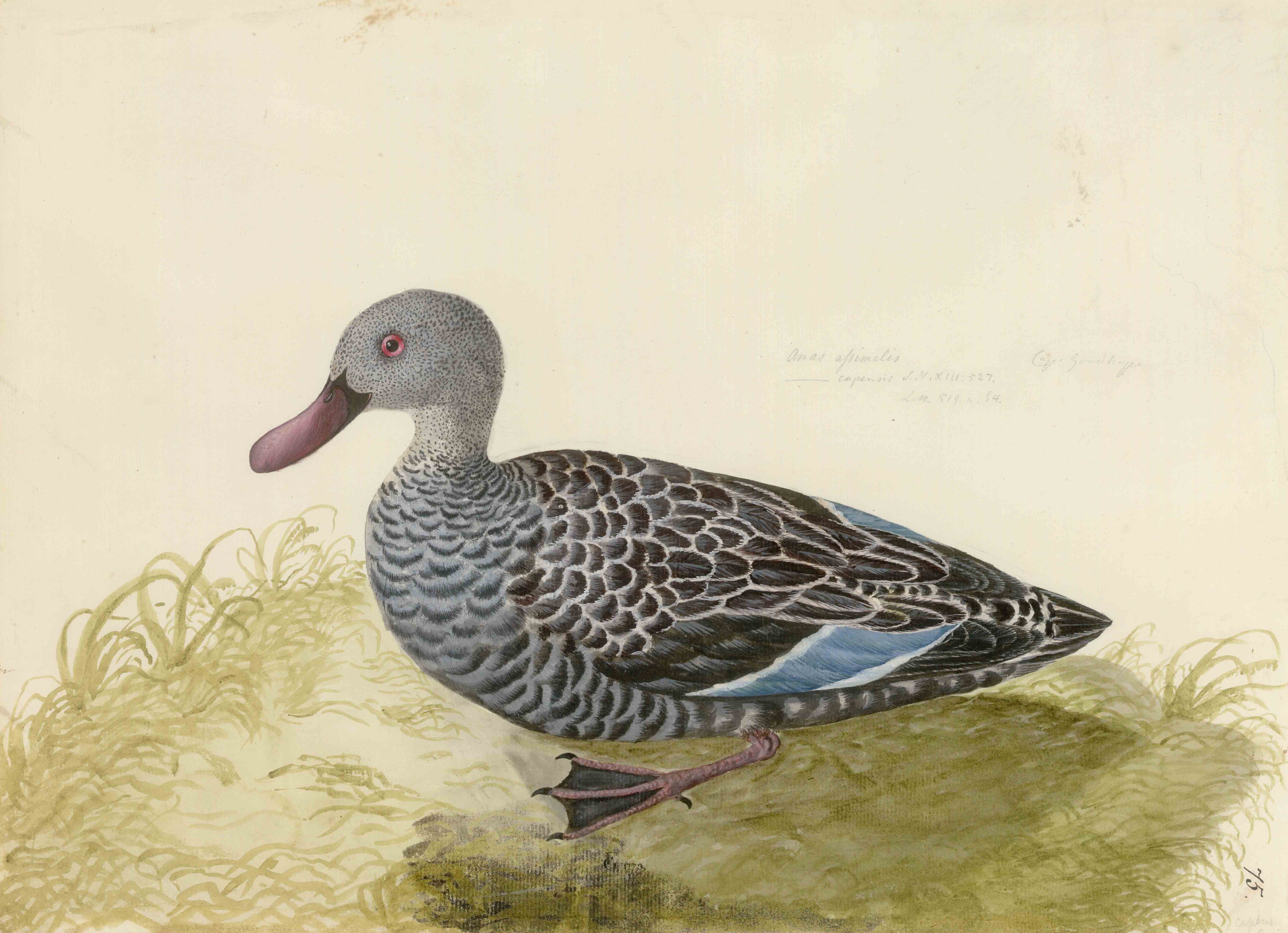
Watercolour made by Georg Forster on James Cook's second voyage to the Pacific Ocean. This painting is the holotype for the species.

The Cape teal was formally described in 1789 by the German naturalist Johann Friedrich Gmelin in his revised and expanded edition of Carl Linnaeus's Systema Naturae. He placed it with all the ducks, geese and swans in the genus Anas and coined the binomial name Anas capensis. Gmelin based his description on the "Cape widgeon" that had been described in 1785 by the English ornithologist John Latham in his A General Synopsis of Birds. The naturalist Joseph Banks had provided Latham with a water-colour drawing of the teal by Georg Forster who had accompanied James Cook on his second voyage to the Pacific Ocean. His picture was drawn in 1773 at the Cape of Good Hope. This picture is now the holotype for the species and is held by the Natural History Museum in London. The genus name Anas is the Latin word for a duck. The specific epithet capensis indicates the Cape of Good Hope. The species is monotypic: no subspecies are recognised.

== Description ==
Like many southern ducks, the sexes are similar. It is very pale and mainly grey, with a browner back and pink on the bill (young birds lack the pink). This is a generally quiet species, except during mating displays. The breeding male has a clear whistle, whereas the female has a feeble "quack". The Cape teal cannot be confused with any other duck in its range.

This species is essentially non-migratory, although it moves opportunistically with the rains. It is a thinly distributed but widespread duck, rarely seen in large groups except the moulting flocks, which may number up to 2000.

The Cape teal feeds on aquatic plants and small creatures (invertebrates, crustaceans and amphibians) obtained by dabbling. The nest is on the ground under vegetation and near water.

The Cape teal is one of the species to which the Agreement on the Conservation of African-Eurasian Migratory Waterbirds (AEWA) applies.

== Gallery ==
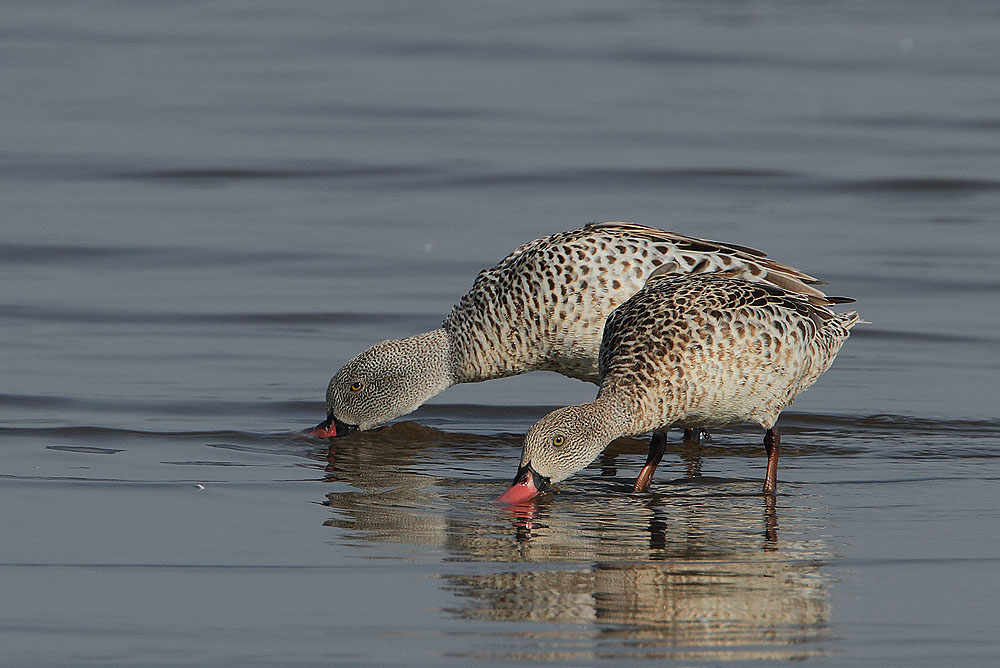
Lake Nakuru, Kenya

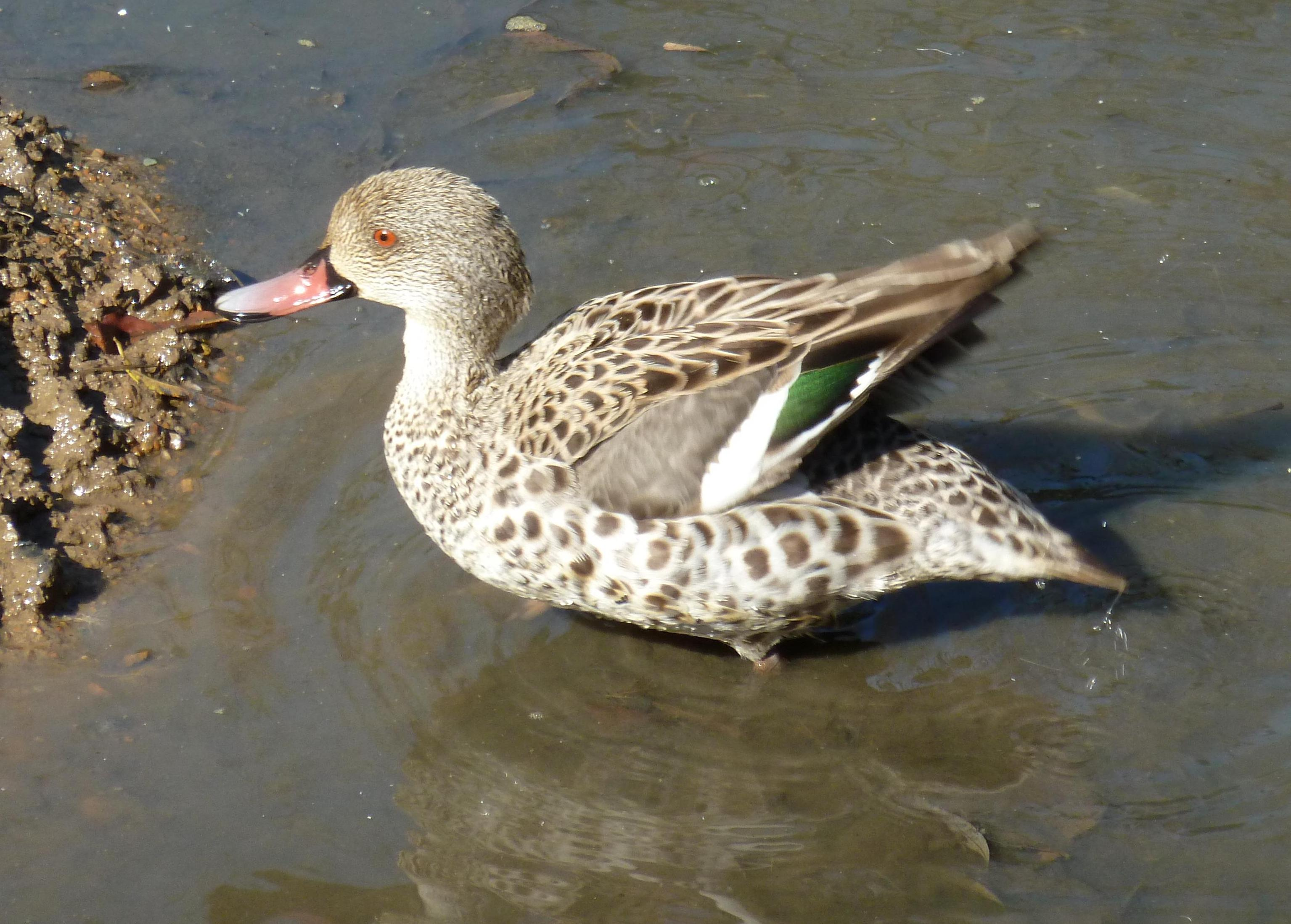
Austin Roberts sanctuary, South Africa

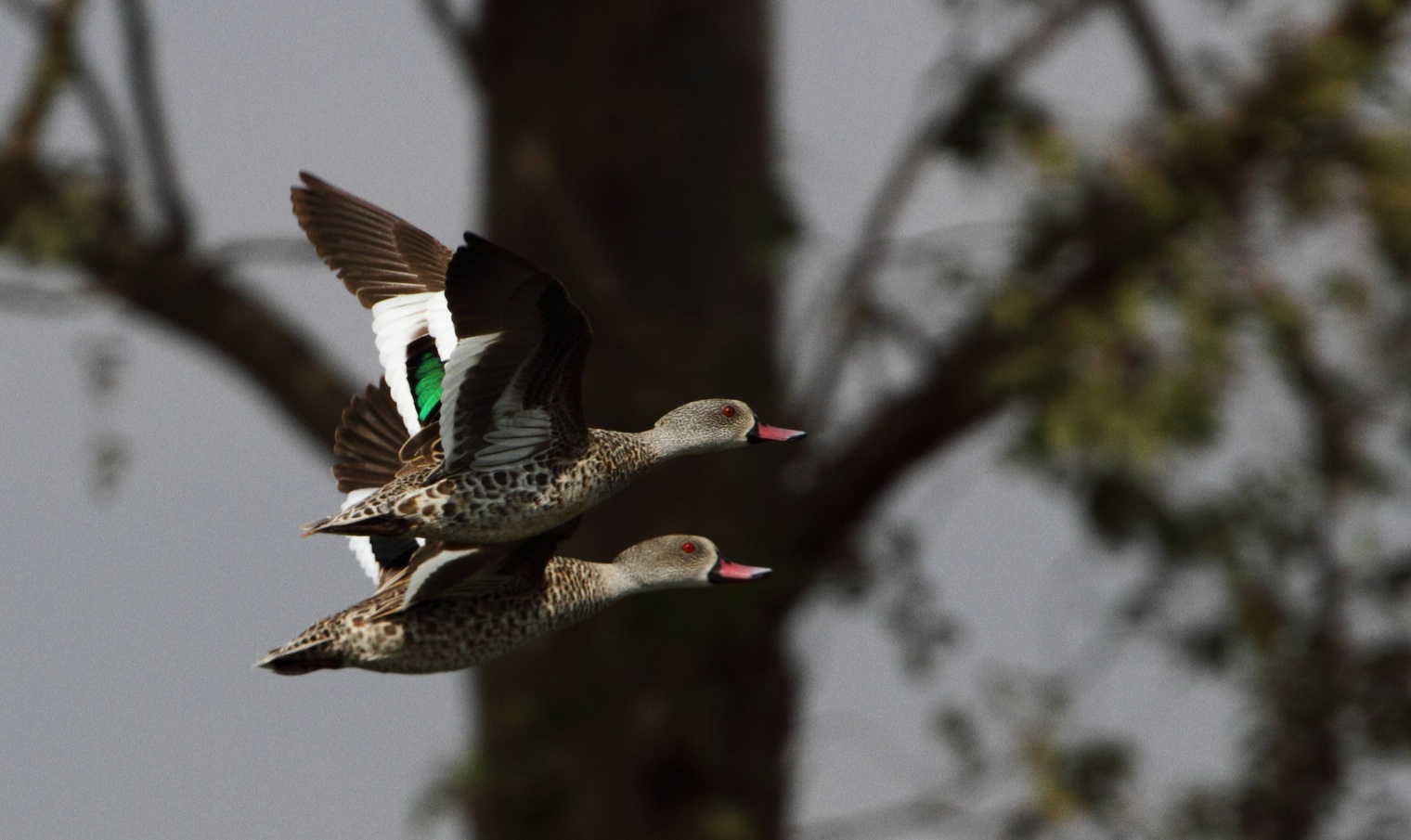
Darville, Pietermaritzburg, South Africa
