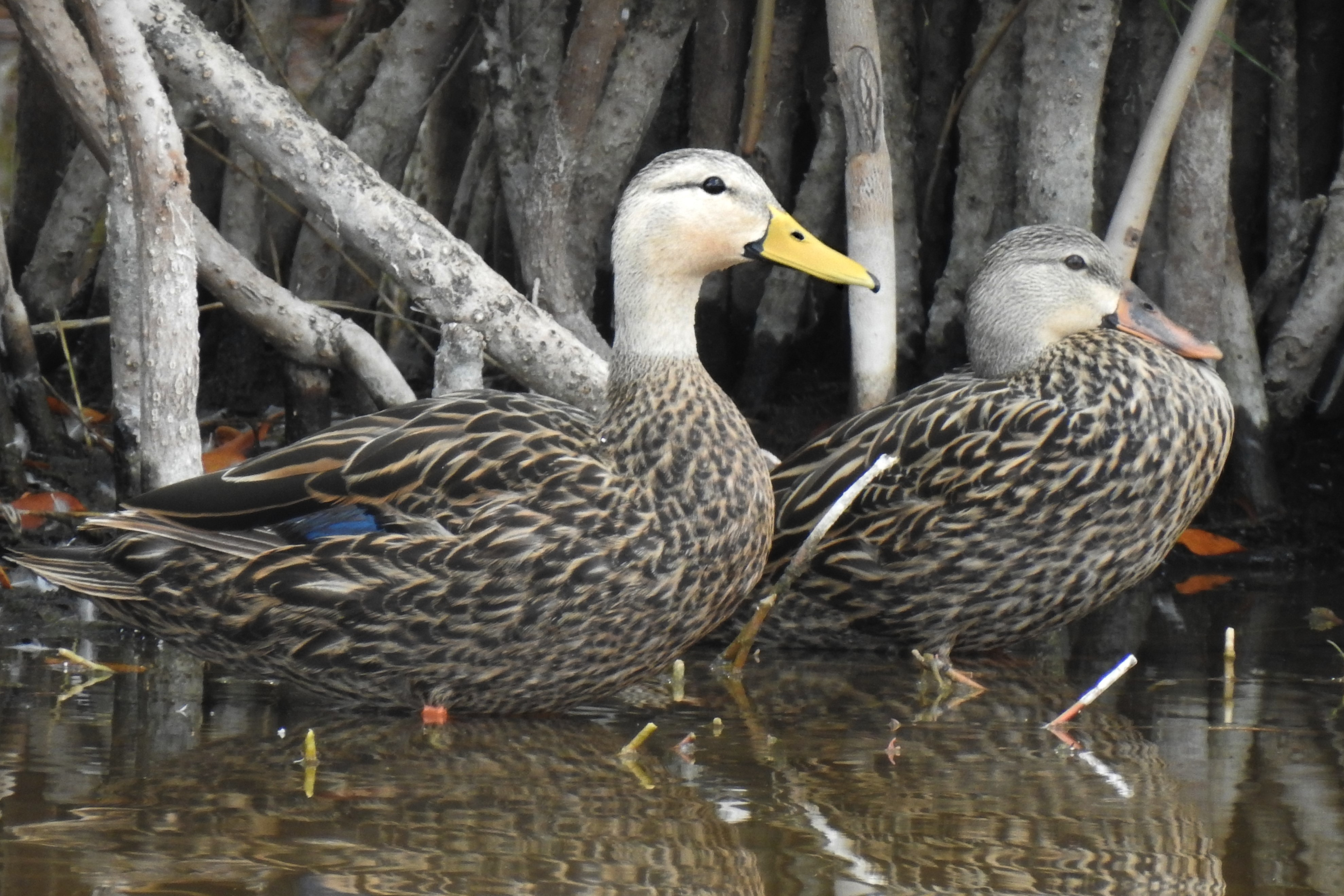
- A pair of mottled ducks (male on left, female on right) at Everglades National Park, Florida, US

Conservation status
- Least Concern (IUCN 3.1)

- Apparently Secure (NatureServe)

Scientific classification
- Kingdom: Animalia
- Phylum: Chordata
- Class: Aves
- Order: Anseriformes
- Family: Anatidae
- Genus: Anas
- Species: A. fulvigula

Binomial name
- Anas fulvigula Ridgway, 1874

Subspecies
- A. f. fulvigula Florida mottled duck; A. f. maculosa Sennett, 1889 Gulf Coast mottled duck

= Mottled duck =

Mottled duck Temporal range: Chibanian–Present

Species of bird

The mottled duck (Anas fulvigula) (Note: Etymology: Anas, Ancient Greek for a duck. fulvigula, "tan-throated", from Latin fulva "tan" + gula, "throat".) or mottled mallard is a medium-sized species of dabbling duck. It is intermediate in appearance between the female mallard and the American black duck. It is closely related to those species, and is sometimes erroneously considered a subspecies of the former.

Along the Gulf of Mexico coast, the mottled duck is one of the most frequently banded waterfowl. This is due in part to the fact that it is mostly non-migratory. Approximately one out of every 20 mottled ducks is banded, making it an extremely prized and sought after bird among hunters.

== Subspecies ==
There are two distinct subspecies of the mottled duck. One subspecies, the Gulf Coast mottled duck (A. f. maculosa), lives on the Gulf of Mexico coast between Alabama and Tamaulipas (Mexico); outside the breeding season, individual birds may venture as far south as Veracruz. The other, the Florida mottled duck (A. f. fulvigula), is resident in central and southern Florida and occasionally strays north to Georgia. The same disjunct distribution pattern was also historically found in the local sandhill cranes. Individuals of both subspecies were introduced into South Carolina in the 1970s and 1980s, where the birds of mixed ancestry have greatly expanded in range, extending through the Atlantic coastal plain of Georgia into northeastern Florida.

== Description ==
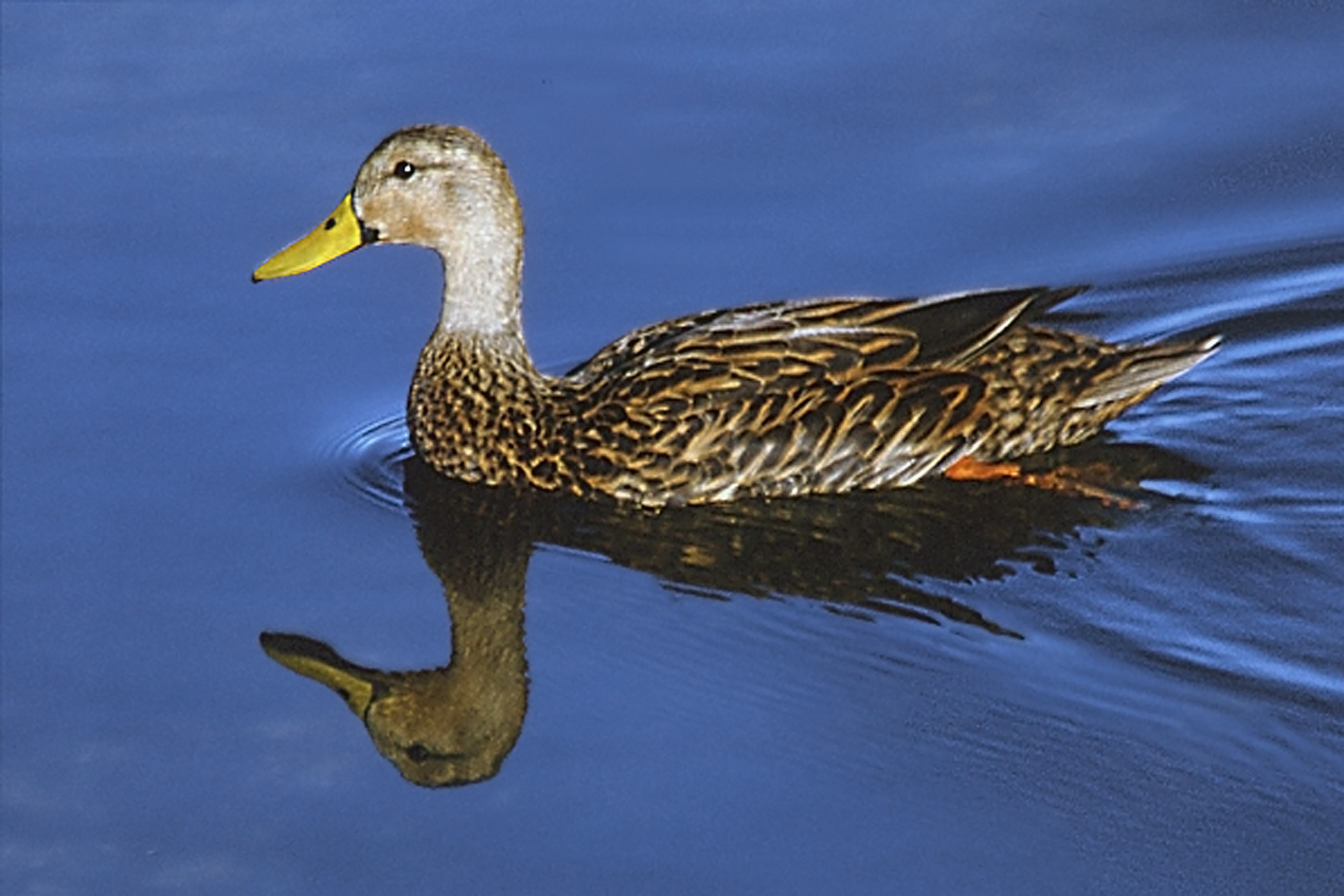
In Florida, U.S.

The adult mottled duck is 44 to 61 cm (17–24 in) long from head to tail. It has a dark body, lighter head and neck, orange legs and dark eyes. Both sexes have a shiny green-blue speculum (wing patch), which is not bordered with white as with the mallard. Males and females are similar, but the male's bill is bright yellow, whereas the female's is deep to pale orange, occasionally lined with black splotches around the edges and near the base.

The plumage is darker than in female mallards, especially at the tail, and the bill is yellower. In flight, the lack of a white border to the speculum is a key difference. The American black duck is darker than most mottled ducks, and its wing-patch is more purple than blue. The behaviour and voice are the same as the mallard.

Mottled ducks feed by dabbling in shallow water, and grazing on land. They mainly eat plants, but also some mollusks and aquatic insects. The ducks are fairly common within their restricted range; they are resident all-year round and do not migrate. Their breeding habitat is brackish and intermediate coastal marshes, but they will also use human developed habitat such as retaining ponds, water impoundments, and agricultural land during the breeding season. According to a review of their breeding behaviors, mottled duck nests may be found in "pastures, levees, dry cordgrass marsh, cutgrass marsh, spoil banks, and small islands."

Measurements:

- Male:
  - Length: 19.7–22.5 in (50–57 cm)
  - Weight: 30.9–43.8 oz (880–1,240 g)
  - Wingspan: 32.7–34.3 in (83–87 cm)
- Female:
  - Length: 18.5–21.0 in (47–53 cm)
  - Weight: 24.7–40.6 oz (700–1,150 g)
  - Wingspan: 31.5–327.2 in (80–831 cm)

== Breeding ==
The nest is a round depression in grass, built by the female. The clutch consists of 8–12 eggs, dull white to olive colored eggs, which measure 5.4–6.2 cm (2.1–2.4 in) in length and 4.1–4.5 cm (1.6–1.8 in) in width.

== Systematics ==
The Floridian population, which occurs approximately south of Tampa, is separated as the nominate subspecies Anas fulvigula fulvigula and is occasionally called the Florida mottled duck or Florida mallard. It differs from the other subspecies, the Gulf Coast mottled duck (A. f. maculosa) (etymology: maculosa, Latin for "the mottled one"), by being somewhat lighter in color and less heavily marked; while both subspecies are intermediate between female mallards and American black ducks, the Florida mottled duck is closer to the former and the Gulf Coast mottled duck closer to the latter in appearance; this is mainly recognizable in the lighter head being quite clearly separated from the darker breast in Gulf Coast mottled ducks, but much less so in Florida mottled ducks. As the subspecies' ranges do not overlap, these birds can only be confused with female mallards and American black ducks however; particularly female American black ducks are often only reliably separable by their dark purple speculum from mottled ducks in the field.

mtDNA control region sequence data indicates that these birds are derived from ancestral American black ducks, being far more distantly related to the mallard, and that the two subspecies, as a consequence of their rather limited range and sedentary habits, are genetically well distinct already.

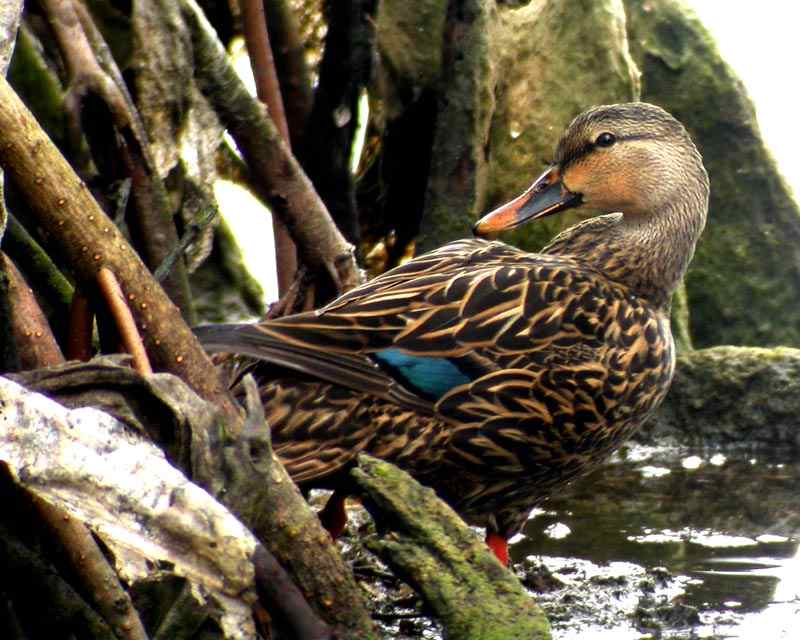
The Florida mottled duck (A. f. fulvigula)

As in all members of the "mallardine" clade of ducks, they are able to produce fertile hybrids with their close relatives, the American black duck and the mallard. This has always been so to a limited extent; individuals of the migratory American black ducks which winter in the mottled duck's range may occasionally stay there and mate with the resident species, and for the mallard, which colonized North America later, the same holds true. Genetic tools have been developed in order to robustly classify hybrids and to assess and monitor the genetic dynamics of introgression between the Florida mottled duck and the mallard.

While the resultant gene flow is no cause for immediate concern, (Note: Except in a scientific sense, as it requires large sample sizes to appropriately study these ducks' phylogeny using mtDNA sequence data, which only documents a bird's evolutionary history on the maternal side.) habitat destruction and excessive hunting could eventually reduce this species to the point where the hybridization with mallards would threaten to make it disappear as a distinct taxon. This especially applies to the Florida mottled duck, in the fairly small range of which rampant habitat destruction due to urbanization and draining of wetlands has taken place in the last decades; this, in combination with climate change affecting the Everglades, could be sufficient to cause the Florida mottled duck to decline to a point where hunting would have to be restricted or prohibited. At present, these birds too appear to be holding their own, with a population of 50,000-70,000 individuals. While hybridization is common, double white bars above and below the speculum are not a sufficient indicator of hybridization and therefore should not be used to determine genetics.

== Gallery ==
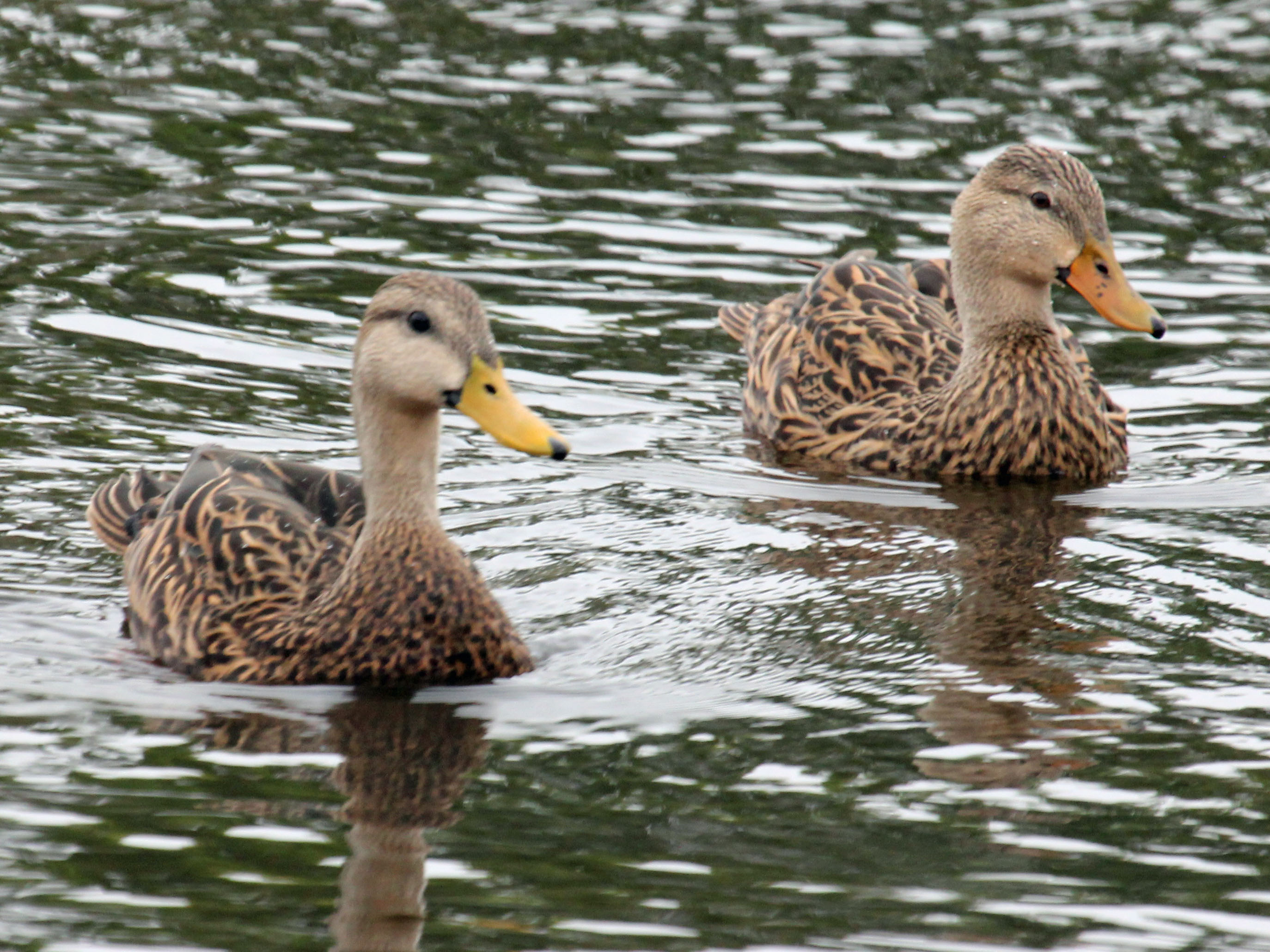
Male and female - Florida

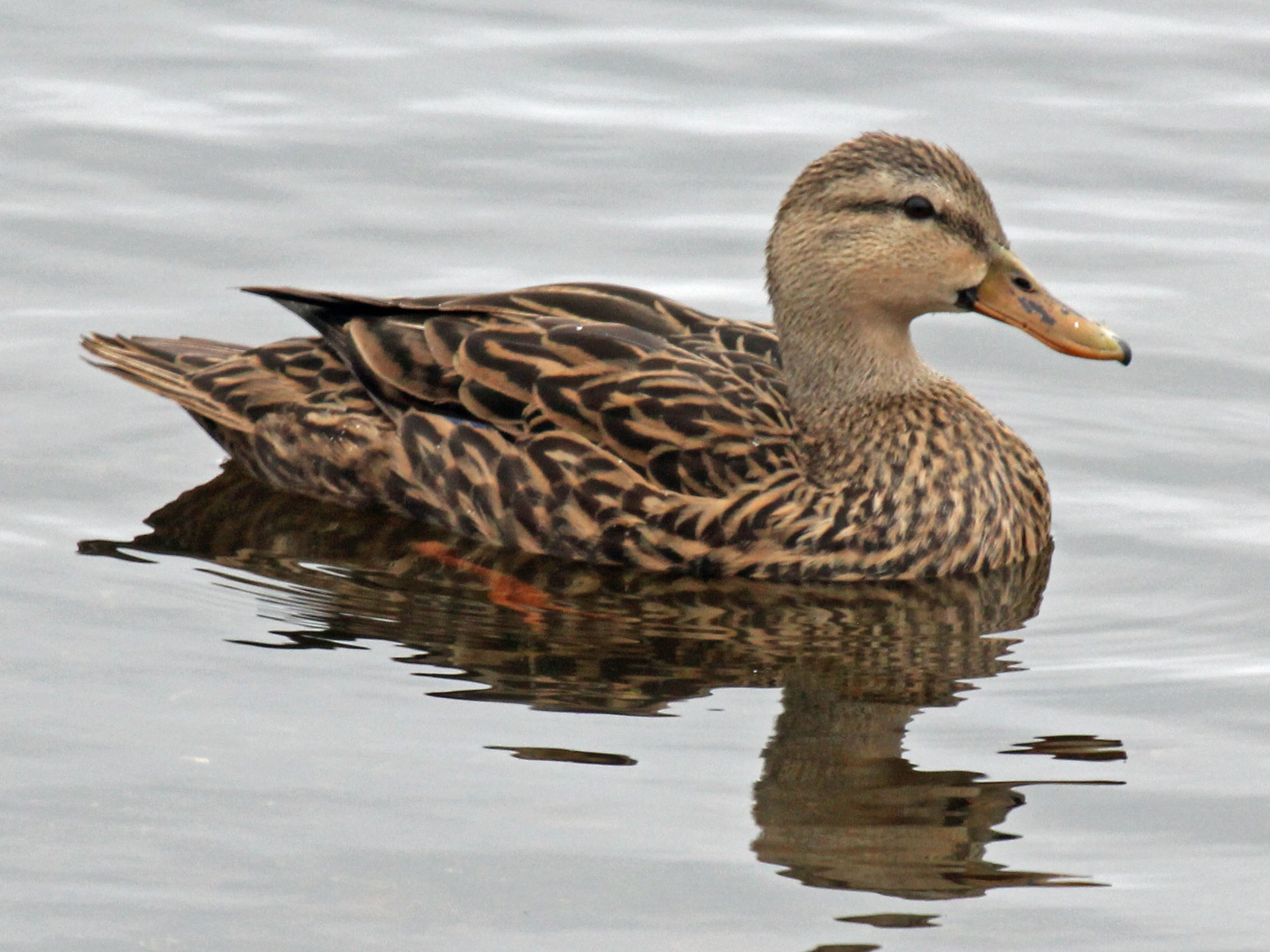
Female - Florida

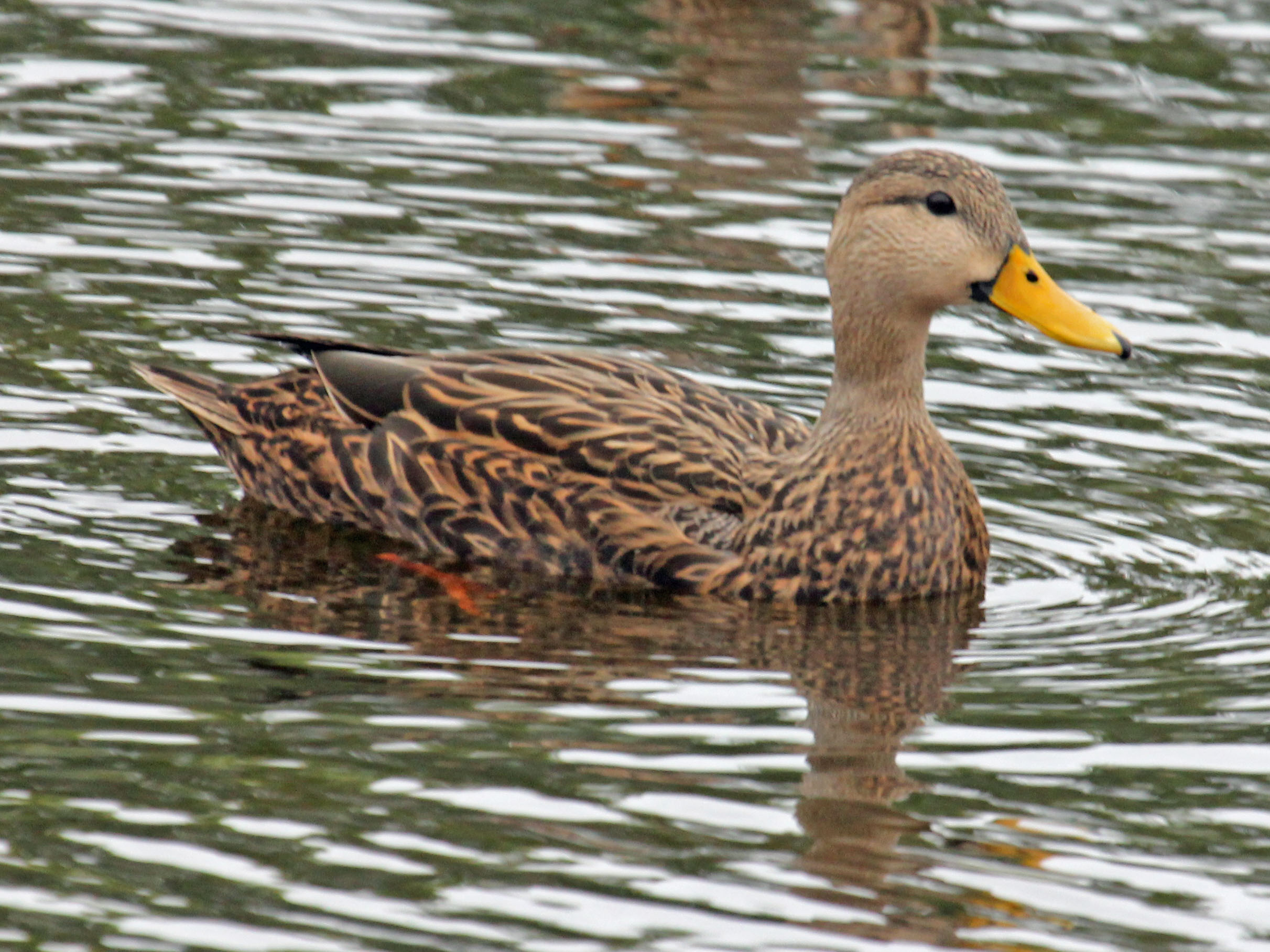
Male - Florida

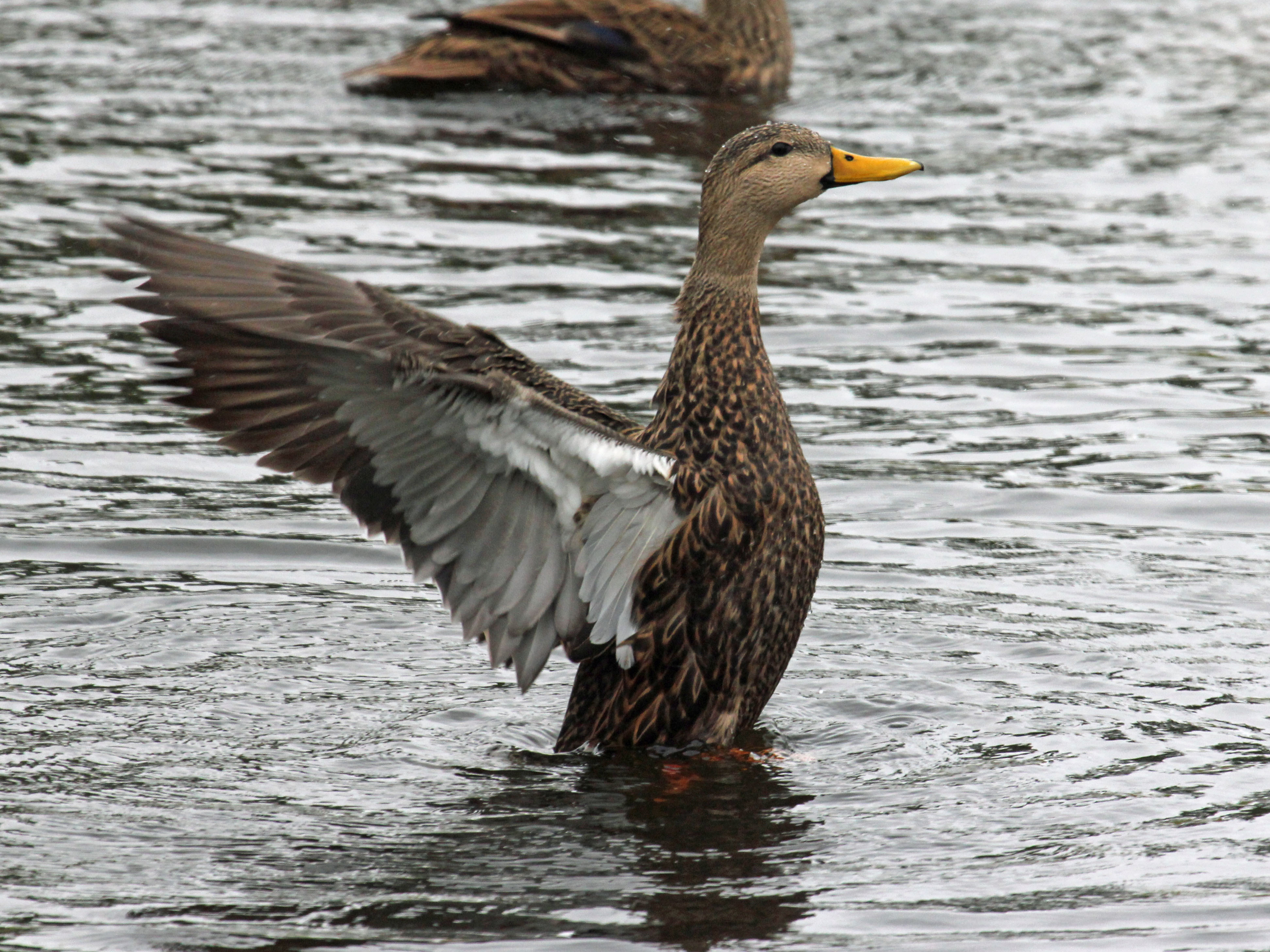
Male - Florida
