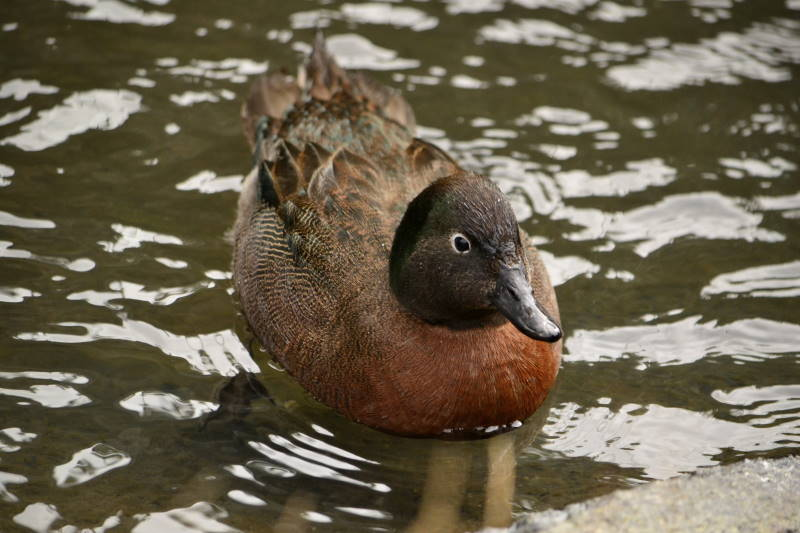
- during breeding season

Conservation status
- Near Threatened (IUCN 3.1)
- CITES Appendix I

Scientific classification
- Kingdom: Animalia
- Phylum: Chordata
- Class: Aves
- Order: Anseriformes
- Family: Anatidae
- Genus: Anas
- Species: A. chlorotis

Binomial name
- Anas chlorotis Gray, 1845
- Distribution map of the brown teal: Current wild remnant populations Probable original distribution where the brown teal is extinct Reintroduced established populations in wild areas

Synonyms
- Anas aucklandica chlorotis Elasmonetta chlorotis

= Brown teal =

Brown teal Temporal range: Late Pleistocene–present (Note: Fossil remains are known from between 130 and 10 thousand years ago.)

Species of bird

The brown teal (Anas chlorotis; Māori: pāteke) is a species of dabbling duck of the genus Anas native to New Zealand. It was long considered conspecific with the flightless Auckland and Campbell teals as Anas aucklandica; the name "brown teal" has also been largely applied to that entire taxon. Common in the early years of European colonisation, the species was heavily harvested as a food source. Its numbers quickly fell, especially in the South Island, and in 1921 it became fully protected. Captive breeding and releasing into predator-controlled areas was successful in establishing localised re-introduced populations after 2003.

== Description ==
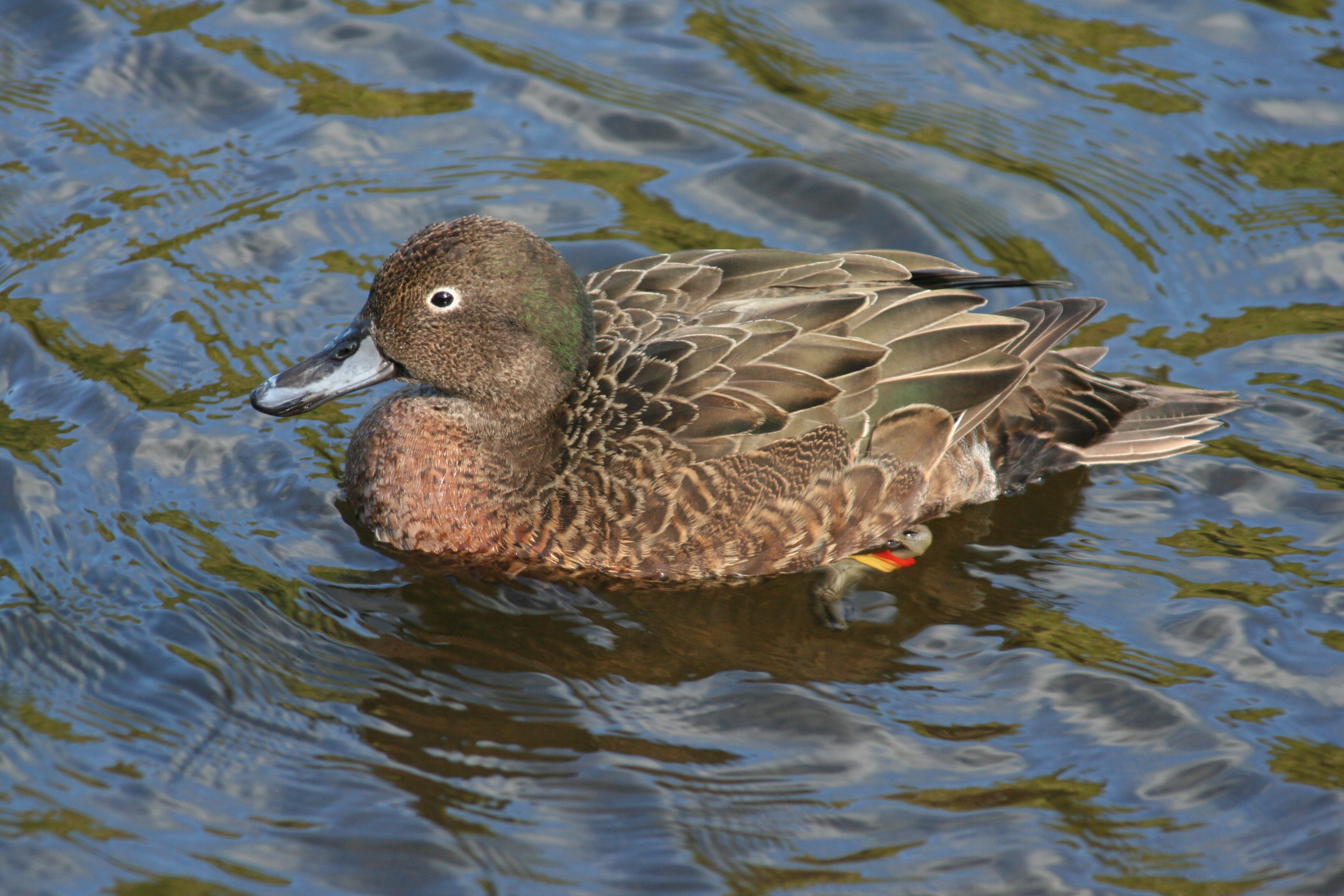
in winter plumage

There are no distinctive differences between a male, female and a juvenile brown teal during non-mating season. They all have a white ring around their eyes as well as a mottled brown colour on their heads and throat. During breeding season the male will begin to change colour, now having a green coloured head, chestnut coloured breast and a white stripe on each side of their body. They will sometimes also have a white clerical neck band. This does vary as some males do tend to be more colourful than others.

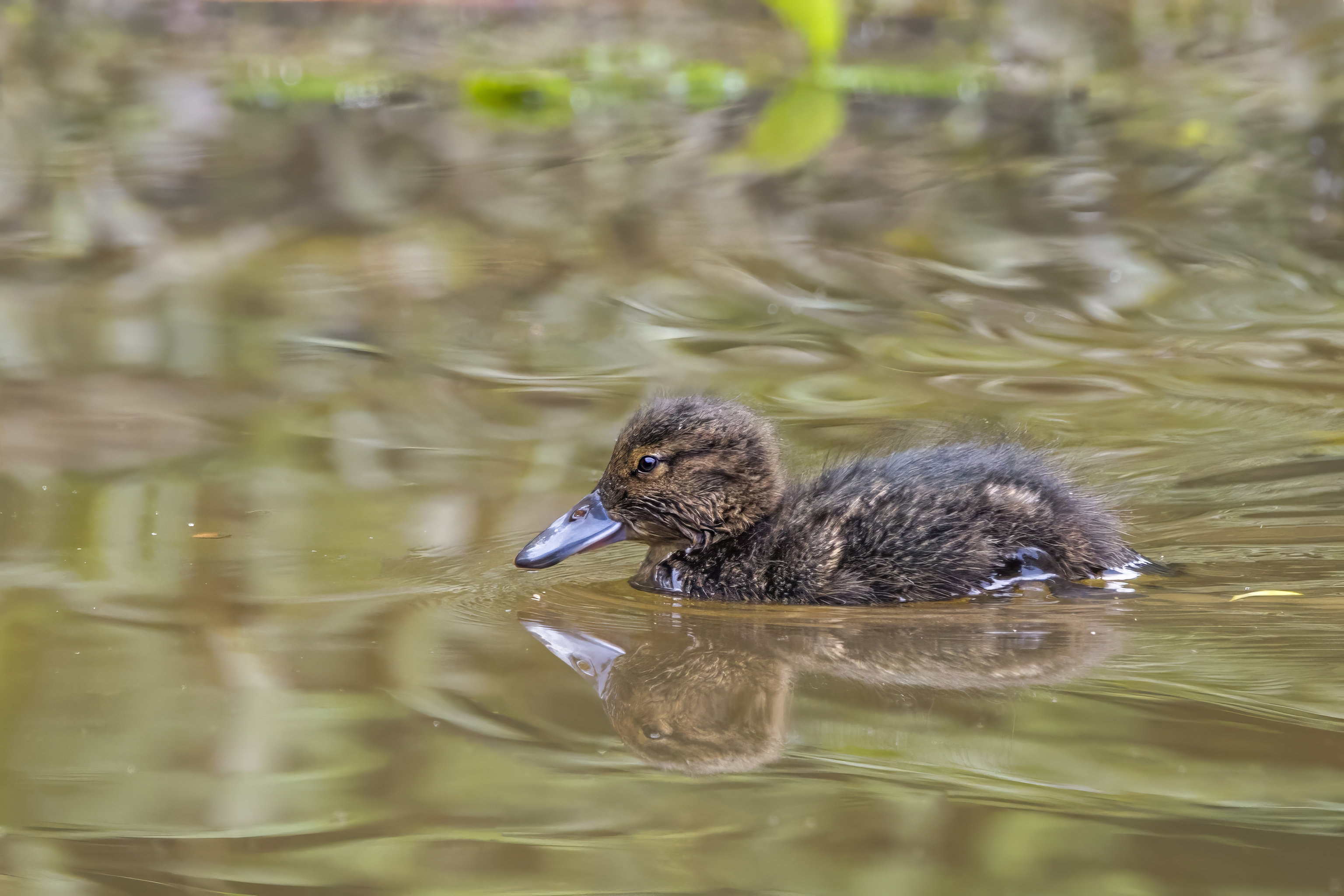
Chick

== Taxonomy ==
The species is considered ancestral to the flightless Auckland teal and Campbell teals, which are now recognised as separate species based on geographic isolation, morphology, and genetics. They are still sometimes referred to as being part of the "brown teal group". The use of the name 'pāteke' is now common and is specific for this particular species.

Concerns have been raised about establishing genetically similar populations during re-introduction. The original captive pateke were sourced from Great Barrier Island, where only one haplotype was found in abundance, compared with eleven haplotypes found in the other remaining population at Mimiwhangata. The newly released flocks exclusively contain these birds of captive origin, and diversity is perhaps now not being fully represented in the National population.

The former population of Fiordland brown teal, which died out by 2013 has been replaced with captive-origin birds. Sequencing showed striking similarity to grey duck and mallard sequences, with which they group. It therefore seems extremely likely that the former Fiordland population of brown teal have at sometime in the past hybridised extensively with these invading species.

== Behaviour ==
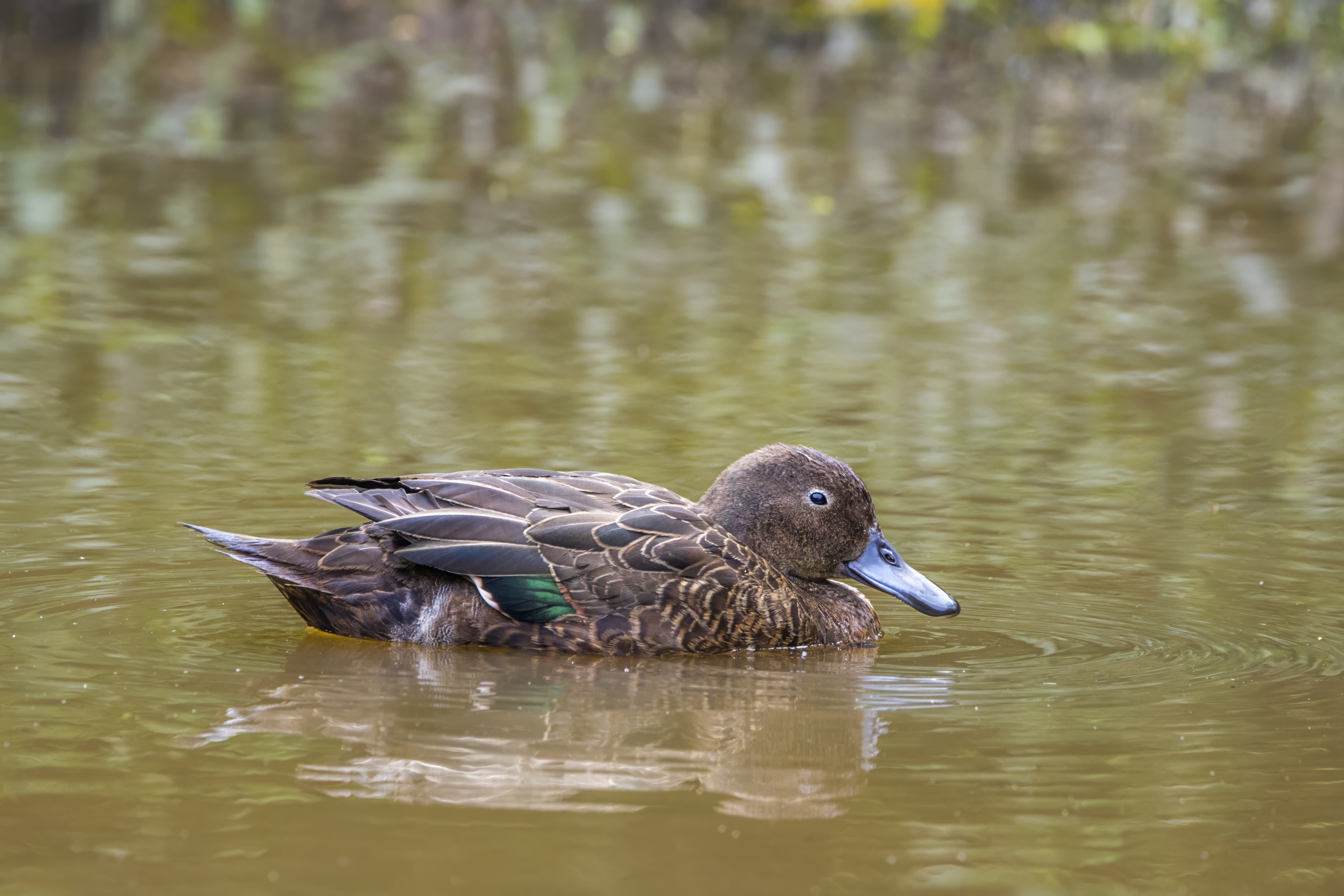
A brown teal on Tiritiri Matangi, New Zealand

The brown teal is largely nocturnal in habit by dabbling duck standards. This is an evolutionary response to natural diurnal predators such as the New Zealand falcon, Eyles' harrier, or skuas further south in their range. Brown teal have no defense against introduced cats, dogs, stoats & ferrets, which can kill adults & ducklings, or against rats which eat eggs.

== Diet ==
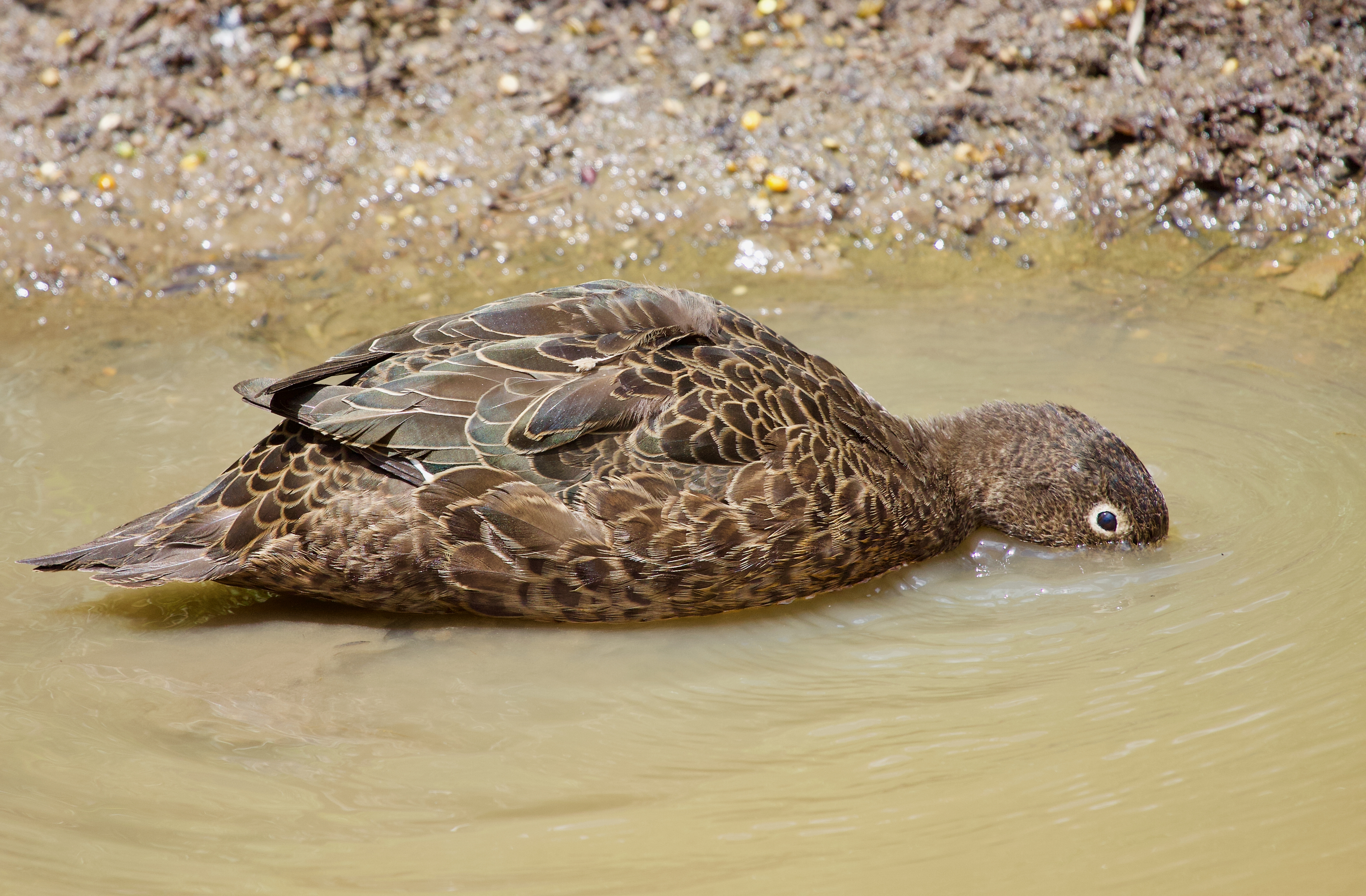
Brown Teal (Anas chlorotis) feeding

It feeds by dabbling and upending, like its relatives. Its diet consists mainly of aquatic invertebrates like insects and their larvae, or crustaceans. It appears quite fond of molluscs. Small species such as pipi (Paphies australis) and large wedge shell (Macomona liliana) are eaten whole and crushed in the gizzard. For feeding on larger cockles such as Austrovenus stutchburyi (New Zealand cockle), at least some New Zealand teals have developed a peculiar technique, as of now undocumented in other birds, to force their rather soft bills between the cockle shells and tear out the flesh with a jackhammer-like pumping motion. At night brown teal will forage on land some distance from the streams used as a refuge during the day (Worthy 2002).

== Breeding ==
Nest of dry grass near water or under shelter of large Carex, heavily lined with down. A clutch of four to eight creamy-brown eggs is laid. Incubation is done by only the female and takes 27–30 days. The male stays in his territory as a guard, aggressive to all other waterfowl.

== Distribution and conservation ==
This species is endangered and occurs predominantly on offshore islands but also in predator-proof sanctuaries on the mainland such as Tawharanui Regional Park. Formerly, it was widespread on the New Zealand mainland, but it disappeared there due to introduced predators like cats, dogs and rats, which easily preyed on this unwary, weakly flying bird. According to the IUCN categorization as VU D1, fewer than 1000 adult birds remain. The species has recently been upgraded to endangered by Birdlife International (Birdlife 2007), and the change will be reflected in the next update of the IUCN red list.

Apart from Fiordland's Arthur Valley, there is only one other site in the South Island where brown teal live in the wild: since 2017, the Department of Conservation and Project Janszoon have released just under 300 of the waterfowl in the Awapoto River in Abel Tasman National Park. The birds are successfully breeding in that location.
