= Bermuda flightless duck =

Bermuda flightless duck Temporal range: Late Pleistocene

Scientific classification
- Domain: Eukaryota
- Kingdom: Animalia
- Phylum: Chordata
- Class: Aves
- Order: Anseriformes
- Family: Anatidae
- Genus: Anas
- Species: †A. pachyscelus

Binomial name
- †Anas pachyscelus Wetmore, 1960

Extinct species of bird

The Bermuda flightless duck (Anas pachyscelus) is an extinct species of flightless duck which was endemic to the island of Bermuda in the North Atlantic Ocean. It was described in 1960 by Alexander Wetmore, from Late Pleistocene subfossil remains collected in 1956 by Bermudan ornithologist David Wingate, at the Wilkinson Quarry in Hamilton Parish. The holotype is a left tarsometatarsus (Specimen No. V22506) held in the National Museum of Natural History in Washington, D.C.
