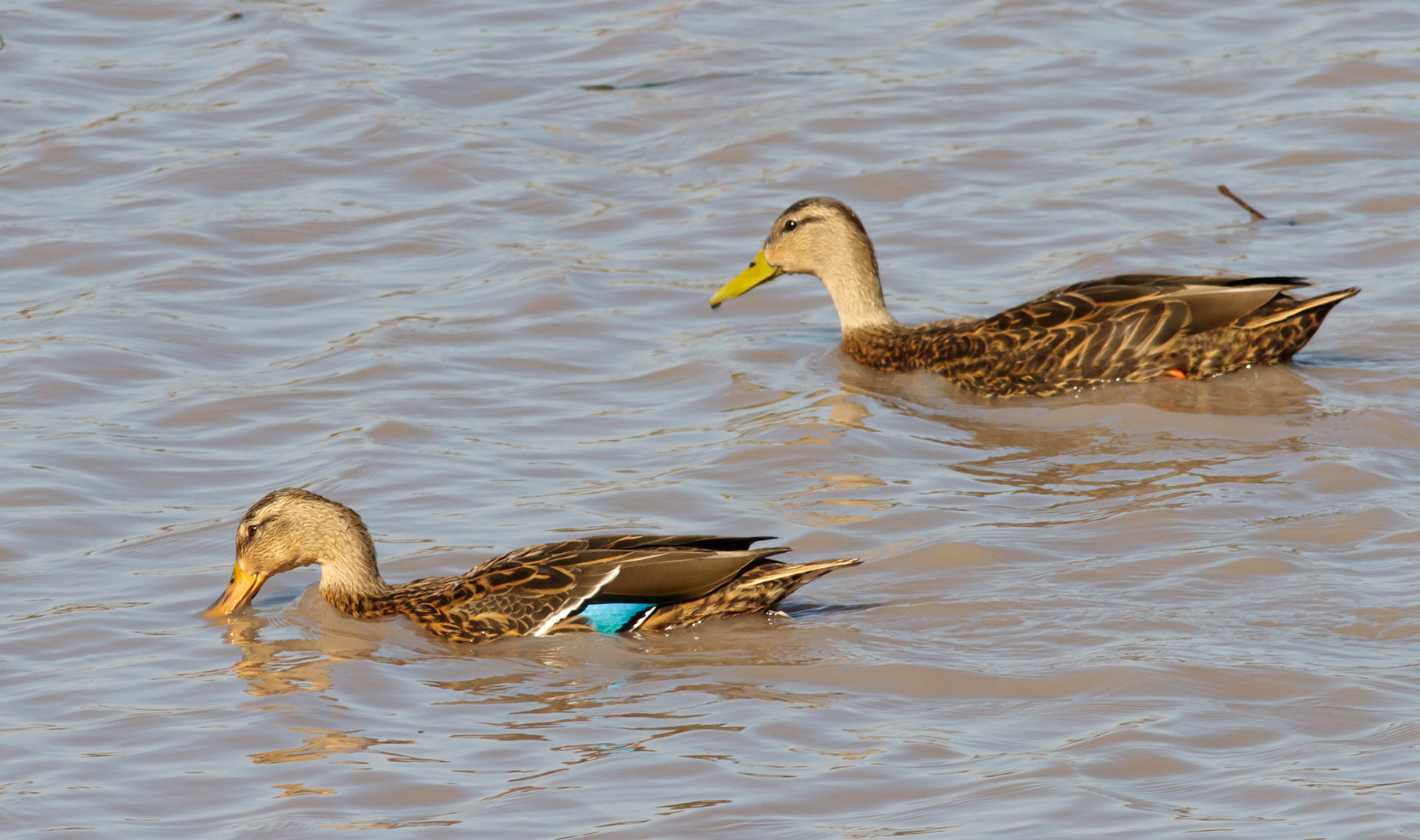
- Male (R), Female (L), San Miguel de Allende, Guanajuato, Mexico

Conservation status
- Secure (NatureServe)

Scientific classification
- Kingdom: Animalia
- Phylum: Chordata
- Class: Aves
- Order: Anseriformes
- Family: Anatidae
- Genus: Anas
- Species: A. diazi

Binomial name
- Anas diazi Ridgway, 1886

= Mexican duck =

Species of bird

The Mexican duck (Anas diazi) is a species of dabbling duck that breeds in Mexico and the southwestern United States.

== Distribution and habitat ==
Most of the population is resident, but some northern birds migrate south to Mexico in winter. The species also occurs widely, but in limited numbers, in Colorado in all seasons and there are photographs of birds referable to this taxon from Utah, Wyoming, Nebraska, and Montana.

Mexican Ducks reside in almost all aquatic habitats.

== Description ==
The bird has a length of 45–55 cm (17.7–21.6 in) and a weight of 849–1,243 g (1.872–2.740 lb)

The Mexican duck is mainly brown, with a blue speculum edged with white, obvious in flight or at rest. The male has a brighter yellow bill than the female.

== Taxonomy ==
The Mexican duck was considered a subspecies of the mallard, as Anas platyrhynchos diazi until 2020, when the American Ornithological Society determined the Mexican Duck to be its own species. Analysis of mtDNA control region sequence data—taking into account hybridization events—indicates it is the southwestern relative of the American black duck and shares a fairly recent common ancestry with this species (McCracken et al. 2001).

Including the Mexican duck in the mallard species was a relic from the usual practice of much of the mid-late 20th century, when all North American "mallardines" as well as the Hawaiian and Laysan ducks were included in the mallard proper as subspecies. This was based on the assumption that hybridization, producing fertile offspring, is an indicator of lack of speciation.

Rather, in these birds it indicates a fairly recent allopatric radiation, which has not yet established solid barriers against gene flow on the molecular level; mate choice is conferred by cues of behavior and plumage in the mallardine ducks, and this, under natural conditions, has precluded a strong selective pressure towards establishment of genetic incompatibility.

== Behavior ==
The Mexican duck primarily feeds on various seeds and aquatic plants.

The male has a nasal call, whereas the female has the very familiar "quack" commonly associated with ducks.

Two to ten eggs are laid per clutch, which take 26 days to incubate.

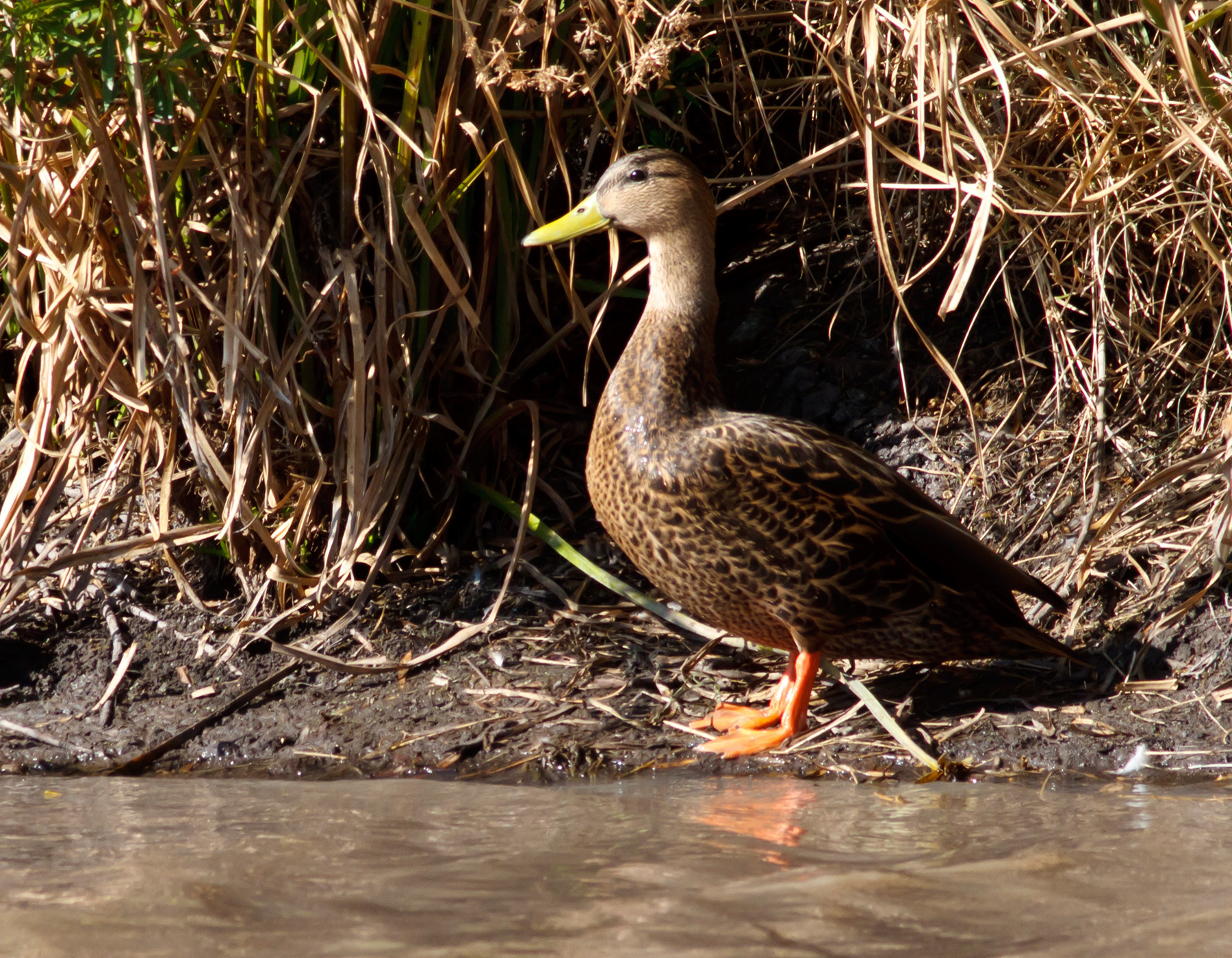
A Male at El Charco de Ingenio, San Miguel de Allende, Guanajuato, Mexico

== Conservation status ==
Although a species of least concern, the Mexican duck is undergoing a slow but marked decline due to destruction of habitat and overhunting. It hybridizes with mallards which are better-adapted to utilizing habitat altered by human activity and thus are spreading throughout this range. Concern has been expressed that this combination of factors may ultimately lead to the disappearance of the Mexican duck as a recognizable taxonomic entity (Rhymer & Simberloff 1996, McCracken et al. 2001, Rhymer 2006), but fairly limited measures such as wetland preservation and preferential hunting of drake mallards would prevent this. The Mexican duck was listed as endangered species at the United States Fish and Wildlife Service in 1967 but was removed in 1978.
