= Anas =

- Female mallard (Anas platyrhynchos) with brood of ducklings.

Scientific classification
- Kingdom: Animalia
- Phylum: Chordata
- Class: Aves
- Order: Anseriformes
- Family: Anatidae
- Tribe: Anatini
- Genus: Anas; Linnaeus, 1758

Type species
- Anas boschas = Anas platyrhynchos Linnaeus, 1766

Species
- 31 extant, see text

Synonyms
- Nettion; Querquedula; Punanetta

Genus of birds

Anas is a genus of dabbling ducks. It includes the pintails, most teals, and the mallard and its close relatives. It formerly included additional species but following the publication of a molecular phylogenetic study in 2009 the genus was split into four separate genera. The genus now contains 31 living species. The name Anas is the Latin for "duck".

== Systematics ==
The genus Anas was introduced by the Swedish naturalist Carl Linnaeus in 1758 in the tenth edition of his Systema Naturae. Anas is the Latin word for a duck. The genus formerly included additional species. In 2009 a large molecular phylogenetic study was published that compared mitochondrial DNA sequences from ducks, geese and swans in the family Anatidae. The results confirmed some of the conclusions of earlier smaller studies and indicated that the genus as then defined was non-monophyletic. Based on the results of this study, Anas was split into four proposed monophyletic genera with five species including the wigeons transferred to the resurrected genus Mareca, ten species including the shovelers and some teals transferred to the resurrected genus Spatula and the Baikal teal placed in the monotypic genus Sibirionetta.

=== Species ===
There are 31 extant species recognised in the genus:

Image	Common name	Scientific name	Distribution
	African black duck	Anas sparsa	eastern and southern sub-Saharan Africa from South Africa n north to South Sudan and Ethiopia with outlying populations in western equatorial Africa, in south east Nigeria, Cameroon and Gabon.
	Yellow-billed duck	Anas undulata	southern and eastern Africa.
	Meller's duck	Anas melleri	eastern Madagascar.
	Pacific black duck	Anas superciliosa	Indonesia, New Guinea, Australia, New Zealand, and many islands in the southwestern Pacific, reaching to the Caroline Islands in the north and French Polynesia in the east
	Laysan duck	Anas laysanensis	Hawaiian Islands
	Hawaiian duck	Anas wyvilliana	Hawaiian islands
	Philippine duck	Anas luzonica	the Philippines
	Indian spot-billed duck	Anas poecilorhyncha	Pakistan and India
	Eastern spot-billed duck	Anas zonorhyncha	Southeast Asia
	Mallard	Anas platyrhynchos	Alaska to Mexico, the Hawaiian Islands, across Eurasia, from Iceland and southern Greenland and parts of Morocco (North Africa) in the west, Scandinavia and Britain to the north, and to Siberia, Japan, and South Korea, in the east, south-eastern and south-western Australia and New Zealand
	Mottled duck	Anas fulvigula	Gulf of Mexico coast between Alabama and Tamaulipas (Mexico) and Florida
	American black duck	Anas rubripes	Saskatchewan to the Atlantic in Canada and the Great Lakes and the Adirondacks in the United States
	Mexican duck	Anas diazi	Mexico and the southern United States.
	Cape teal	Anas capensis	sub-Saharan Africa
	White-cheeked pintail	Anas bahamensis	Caribbean, South America, and the Galápagos Islands
	Red-billed teal	Anas erythrorhyncha	southern and eastern Africa
	Yellow-billed pintail	Anas georgica	South America, the Falkland Islands and South Georgia
	Eaton's pintail	Anas eatoni	island groups of Kerguelen and Crozet in the southern Indian Ocean
	Northern pintail	Anas acuta	Europe, Asia and North America
	Eurasian teal	Anas crecca	northern Eurasia
	Green-winged teal	Anas carolinensis	North America except on the Aleutian Islands
	Yellow-billed teal	Anas flavirostris	Argentina, the Falkland Islands, Chile, Peru, Bolivia, Uruguay, and Brazil.
	Andean teal	Anas andium (formerly included in A. flavirostris)	Andean highlands of Colombia, Venezuela, and Ecuador
	Sunda teal	Anas gibberifrons	Indonesia.
	Andaman teal	Anas albogularis (formerly included in A. gibberifrons)	Andaman Islands (India) and Great Coco Island (Burma)
	Grey teal	Anas gracilis	Australia and New Zealand
	Chestnut teal	Anas castanea	Tasmania and southern Victoria, New Guinea and Lord Howe Island
	Bernier's teal	Anas bernieri	Madagascar
	Brown teal	Anas chlorotis	New Zealand
	Auckland teal	Anas aucklandica	Auckland Islands south of New Zealand
	Campbell teal	Anas nesiotis (formerly included in A. aucklandica)	New Zealand

Extinct Species

- †Mariana mallard, Anas oustaleti
- †Mascarene teal, Anas theodori
- †Chatham Island Duck, Anas chathamica

Formerly placed in Anas:

- Bronze-winged duck, Speculanas specularis
- Crested duck, Lophonetta specularioides
- Baikal teal Sibirionetta formosa
- Salvadori's teal, Salvadorina waigiuensis
- species in the genus Mareca, the wigeons (including the gadwall and the falcated duck)
- species in the genus Spatula, the shovelers and related teals

=== Phylogeny ===
Cladogram based on the analysis of Gonzalez and colleagues published in 2009.

- Anas
  - - - - - - Auckland teal (A. aucklandica)
            - Brown teal (A. chlorotis)
          - Bernier's teal (A. bernieri)
        - - Chestnut teal (A. castanea)
          - Sunda teal (A. gibberifrons)
      - - - Yellow-billed teal (A. flavirostris)
          - Green-winged teal (A. carolinensis)
        - Eurasian teal (A. crecca)
    - - - - - Northern pintail (A. acuta)
            - Yellow-billed pintail (A. georgica)
          - Red-billed teal (A. erythrorhyncha)
        - White-cheeked pintail (A. bahamensis)
      - Cape teal (A. capensis)
  - - - - - - - - - - Mexican duck (A. diazi)
                    - American black duck (A. rubripes)
                    - Mottled duck (A. fulvigula)
                  - Mallard (A. platyrhynchos)
                - Indian spot-billed duck (A. poecilorhyncha)
              - Philippine duck (A. luzonica)
            - Laysan duck (A. laysanensis)
          - Pacific black duck (A. superciliosa)
        - Meller's duck (A. melleri)
      - Yellow-billed duck (A. undulata)
    - African black duck (A. sparsa)

=== Fossil record ===
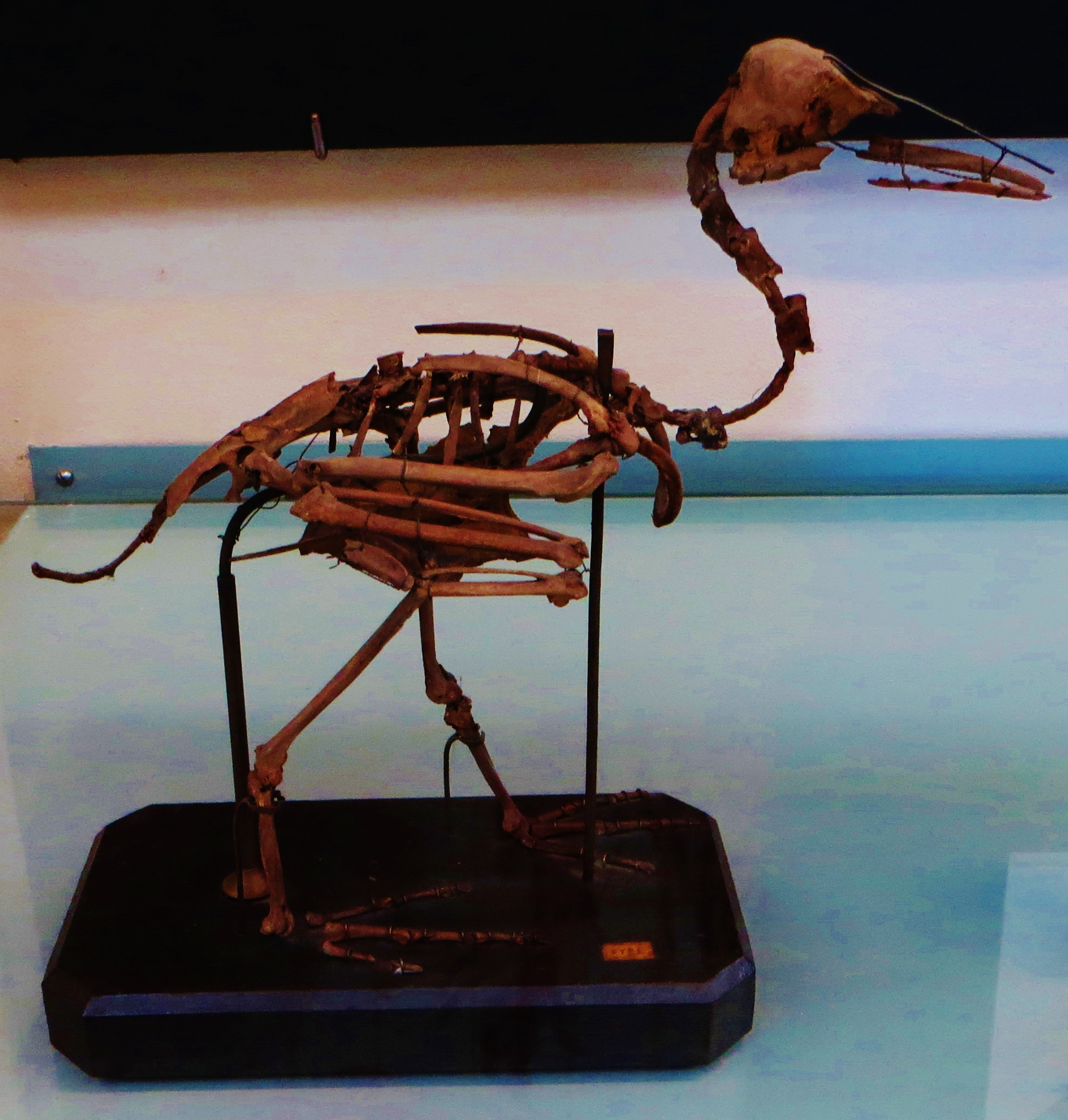
Anas blanchardi fossil

A number of fossil species of Anas have been described. Their relationships are often undetermined:

- †Anas sp. (Late Miocene of China)
- †Anas sp. (mid-sized species from the Late Miocene of Rudabánya, Hungary)
- †Anas amotape (Campbell 1979) (Talara Tar Seeps, Late Pleistocene of Peru)
- †Anas bunkeri (Wetmore 1944) (Early -? Middle Pliocene – Early Pleistocene of WC USA) – Nettion red-and-green head clade?
- †Anas cheuen Agnolín 2006 (Early-Middle Pleistocene of Argentina) – Dafila?
- †Anas ganii Burchak-Abramovich, Suspanov and David 1996 (Late Pliocene/Early Pleistocene of Moldova)
- †Anas greeni (Brodkorb 1964) (Late Miocene?/Early Pliocene of South Dakota, USA) – Nettion red-and-green head clade (doubtful)?
- †Anas itchtucknee McCoy 1963 (Late Pleistocene of Florida, USA) doubtful validity
- †Anas kisatibiensis Burchak-Abramovich and Mczedlidze 1995 (nomen nudum) (Early Pliocene of Kisatibi, Georgia)
- †Anas kurochkini Zelenkov & Panteleyev 2015 (Late Miocene of Sea of Azov, southern Russia)
- †Anas lambrechti Spillman 1942 [Archaeoquerquedula lambrechti] (Pleistocene of Ecuador)
- †Anas ogallalae (Brodkorb 1962) (Late Miocene?/Early Pliocene of Kansas, USA) – Nettion red-and-green head clade (doubtful)?
- Bermuda Islands flightless duck †Anas pachyscelus Wetmore 1960 (Late Pleistocene of Bermuda, W Atlantic)
- †Anas pullulans (Brodkorb 1961) (Late Miocene?/Early Pliocene of Oregon, USA) – Punanetta?
- †Anas schneideri Emslie 1985 (Late Pleistocene of Little Box Elder Cave, USA)

Several prehistoric waterfowl supposedly part of the Anas assemblage are nowadays not placed in this genus anymore, at least not with certainty:

- †"Anas" basaltica (Late Oligocene of Czech Republic) is apparently an indeterminate heron.
- †"Anas" blanchardi, "A." consobrina, "A." natator are now in Mionetta
- †"Anas" creccoides (Early-mid Oligocene of Belgium), "A." risgoviensis (Late Miocene of Bavaria, Germany) and "A." skalicensis (Early Miocene of Czech Republic), though possibly anseriform, cannot be placed with any certainty among modern birds at all.
- †"Anas" albae (Late Miocene of Hungary), "A." eppelsheimensis (Early Pliocene of Germany) and "A." isarensis (Late Miocene of Germany) are apparently Anatidae of unclear affiliations
- †"Anas" integra and "A." oligocaena are now in Dendrochen.
- †"Anas" lignitifila from the Late Miocene of Tuscany has been moved to its own genus, Bambolinetta, being a highly unusual marine waterfowl.
- †"Anas" luederitzensis (Early Miocene of Namibia) may belong within Oxyurini
- †"Anas" robusta is now tentatively placed in Anserobranta.
- †"Anas" sansaniensis is now placed in Chenoanas
- †"Anas" velox (Middle – Late? Miocene of C Europe) and "A." meyerii (Middle Miocene of Öhningen, Germany; possibly the same species) do not seem to belong Anas, and they may be ancestral dabbling ducks.

Anas elapsum (Late Pleistocene of Australia) is now synonymised with the extant Hardhead. Anas gracilipes and Anas strenuum (Late Pleistocene of Australia) are both junior synonyms of the extant Chestnut teal.

Highly problematic, albeit in a theoretical sense, is the placement of the moa-nalos. These may be descended from a common ancestor of dabbling ducks such as the Pacific black duck, Laysan duck, and mallard. Phylogenetically, they may even form a clade within the traditional genus Anas. However, when compared to these species – which are representative of dabbling ducks in general – the moa-nalos are a radical departure from the Anseriforme bauplan. This illustrates that in a truly evolutionary sense, a strictly phylogenetic taxonomy may be difficult to apply.

== See also ==
- Mallard complex
- List of recently extinct birds
- Late Quaternary prehistoric birds
- List of fossil bird genera
