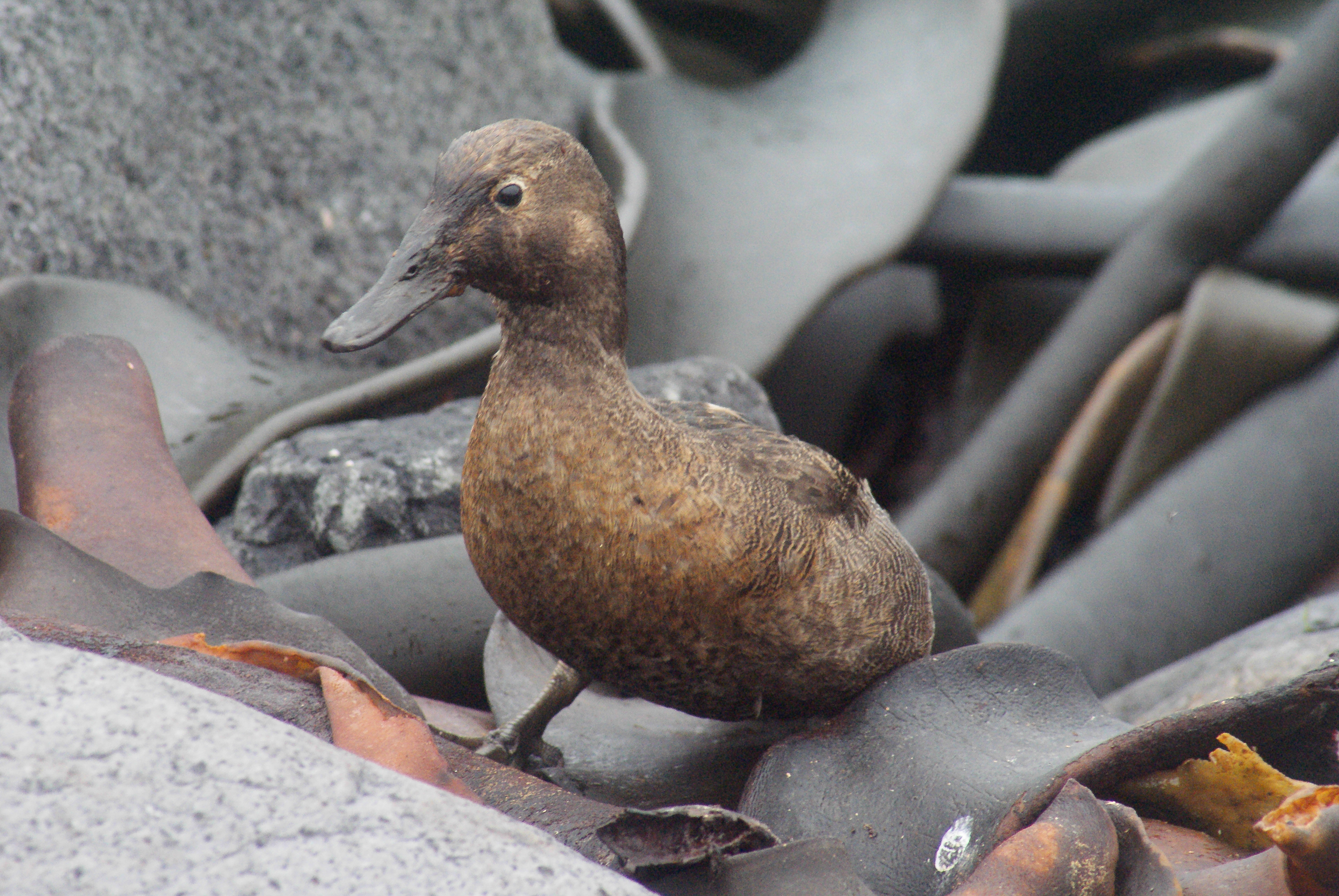
- Auckland teal on Enderby Island

Conservation status
- Near Threatened (IUCN 3.1)
- CITES Appendix I

Scientific classification
- Kingdom: Animalia
- Phylum: Chordata
- Class: Aves
- Order: Anseriformes
- Family: Anatidae
- Genus: Anas
- Species: A. aucklandica

Binomial name
- Anas aucklandica (G.R. Gray, 1844)
- Extant Extinct

Audio
- Call of the Auckland teal

= Auckland teal =

Species of bird

The Auckland teal (Anas aucklandica) (Māori: Tētē kākāriki), also known as Auckland Islands teal, is a species of dabbling duck of the genus Anas that is endemic to Auckland Islands south of New Zealand. The species was once found throughout the Auckland Islands, but is now restricted to the islands that lack introduced predators: Adams Island, Enderby Island, Disappointment Island and a few smaller islands. An old report of "the same flightless duck" on North East Island, The Snares group most likely refers to a straggler.

The Auckland teal is smaller and rarer than the brown teal of the main islands of New Zealand, a species with which it was once considered conspecific. The plumage is all over brown with a hint of green on the neck and a conspicuous white eyering. The female is slightly darker than the male. The wings are very small and the species has, like the related Campbell teal, lost the power of flight.

The Auckland teal is mostly crepuscular to nocturnal, preferring to hide from predators (New Zealand falcons and skuas) during the day. The species inhabits a variety of habitats with the islands, including tussock fields, mega herb shrubland and coastal waters. It is carnivorous for the most part, feeding on marine invertebrates, insects, amphipods and other small Invertebrates. Auckland teal are territorial and rarely form flocks.

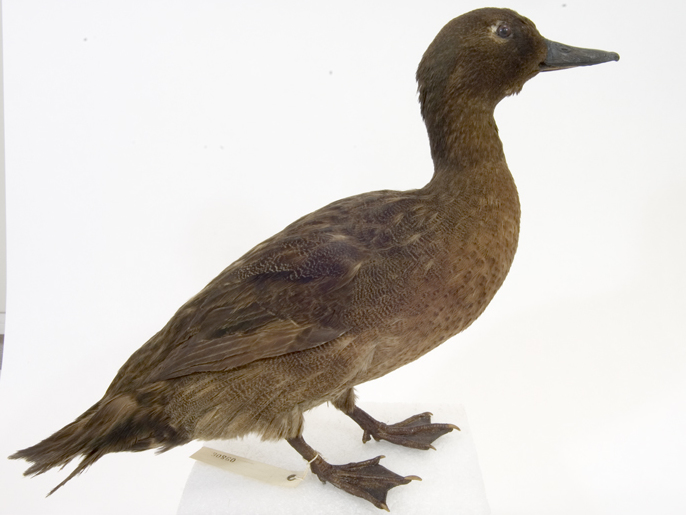
Auckland teal mount in the collection of Auckland Museum
