= Anas kurochkini =

Anas kurochkini Temporal range: Late Miocene

Scientific classification
- Kingdom: Animalia
- Phylum: Chordata
- Class: Aves
- Order: Anseriformes
- Family: Anatidae
- Genus: Anas
- Species: †A. kurochkini

Binomial name
- †Anas kurochkini Zelenkov & Panteleyev, 2015

Extinct species of bird

Anas kurochkini is an extinct species of Anas that lived around the Sea of Azov during the Late Miocene.
