= Chenoanas =

Chenoanas Temporal range: Middle Miocene–Late Miocene

Scientific classification
- Kingdom: Animalia
- Phylum: Chordata
- Class: Aves
- Order: Anseriformes
- Family: Anatidae
- Genus: †Chenoanas

Type species
- †Chenoanas deserta Zelenkov, 2012

Other species
- †C. asiatica Zelenkov et al., 2018; †C. sansaniensis (Milne-Edwards, 1867)

Extinct genus of birds

Chenoanas is an extinct genus of duck from the Miocene of Eurasia.

Three species have been described:

- †Chenoanas sansaniensis (Milne-Edwards 1867) (early to middle Miocene of eastern Siberia and France) - originally described as a species of Anas
- †C. deserta Zelenkov 2012 (middle Miocene of Western Mongolia)
- †C. asiatica Zelenkov & Stidham 2018 (middle Miocene of Inner Mongolia (China) and Western Mongolia)

== See also ==
- 2018 in paleontology
