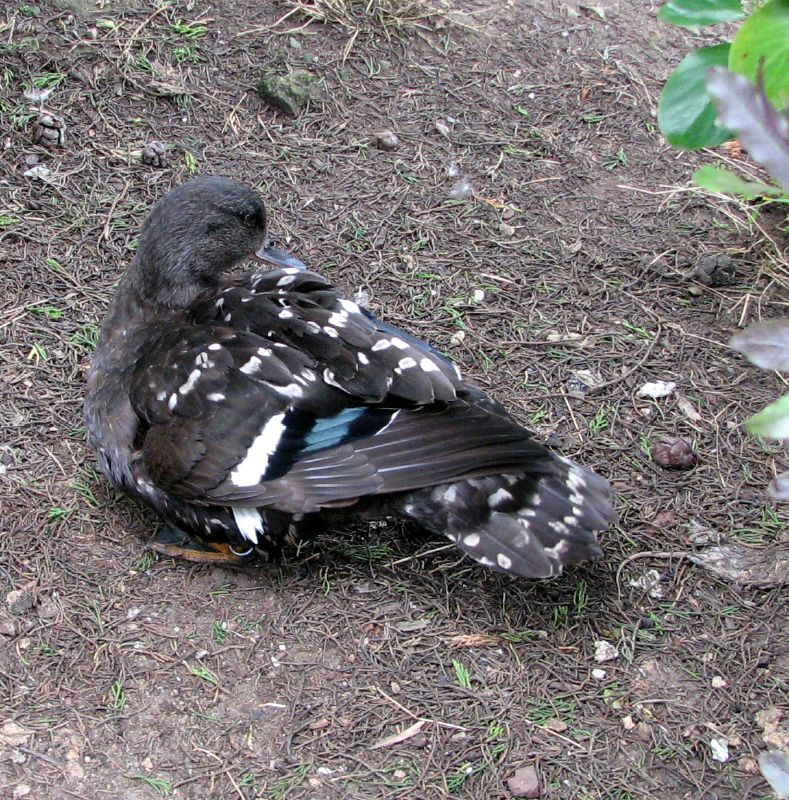

Conservation status
- Least Concern (IUCN 3.1)

Scientific classification
- Kingdom: Animalia
- Phylum: Chordata
- Class: Aves
- Order: Anseriformes
- Family: Anatidae
- Genus: Anas
- Species: A. sparsa

Binomial name
- Anas sparsa Eyton, 1838

Subspecies
- A. s. sparsa Eyton, 1838 South African black duck; A. s. leucostigma Rüppell, 1845 pink-billed black duck

= African black duck =

Species of bird

The African black duck (Anas sparsa) is a species of duck of the genus Anas. It is genetically closest to the mallard group, but shows some peculiarities in its behavior and (as far as they can be discerned) plumage; it is accordingly placed in the subgenus Melananas pending further research.

== Description ==
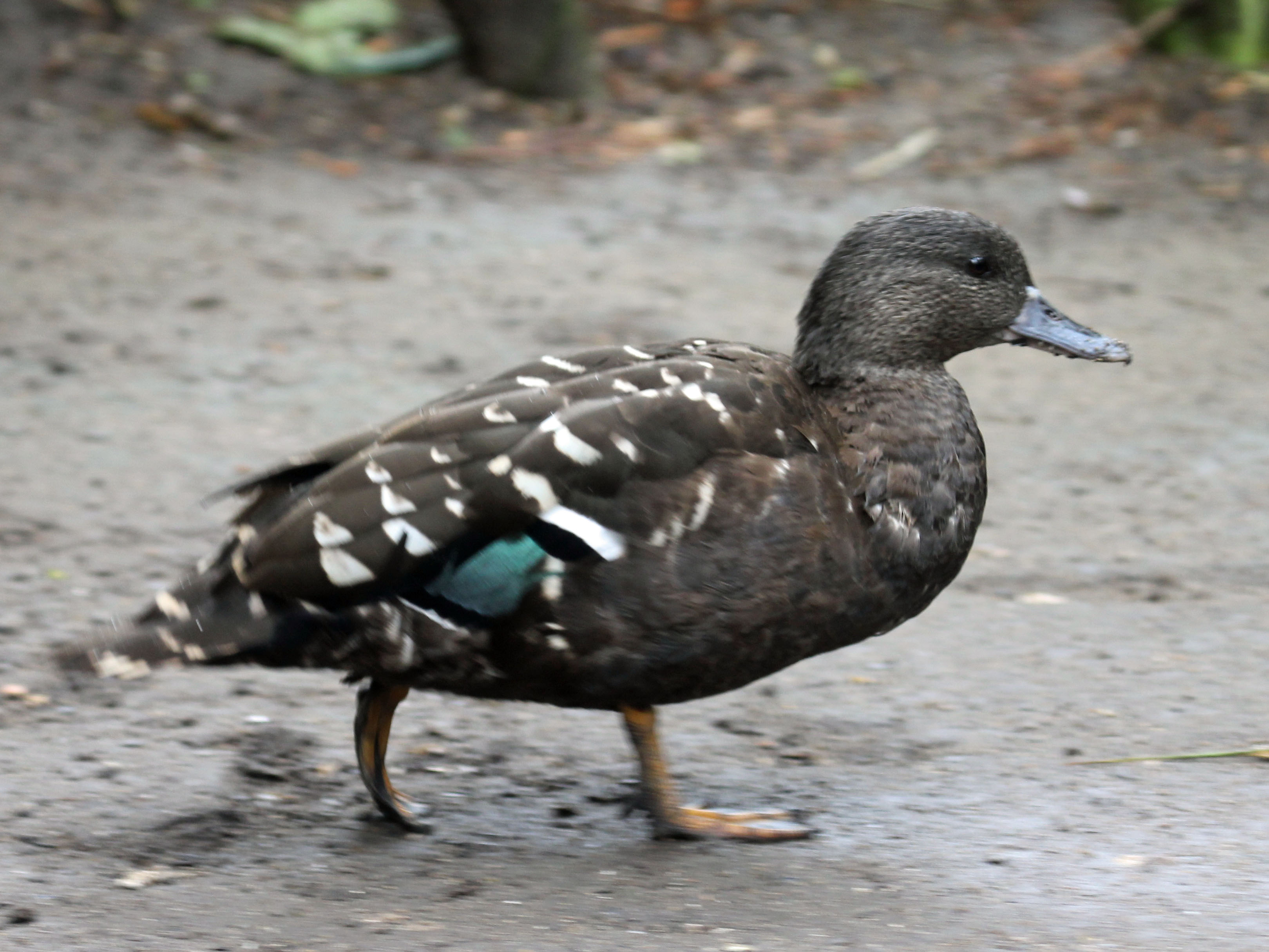
African black duck

The African black duck is a black duck with pronounced white marks on its back, a dark bill, and orange legs and feet. A purpish-blue speculum is often visible, especially in flight. It lives in central and southern Africa. It is also known as the black river duck, or (A. s. leucostigma) West African black duck or Ethiopian black duck. It is a medium-sized duck, with a length of 48–57 cm (19–22 in). The male is larger than the female.

== Distribution ==
The African black duck is mainly found in eastern and southern sub-Saharan Africa from South Africa north to South Sudan and Ethiopia with outlying populations in western equatorial Africa, in southeast Nigeria, Cameroon and Gabon.

== Behavior and reproduction ==
It is a very shy and territorial duck. It is usually seen in pairs or small flocks. It breeds throughout the year in different areas. Incubation is about 30 days by the mother and the fledgling period is 86 days and only the mother takes care of the young. Their egg quantity ranges from 4 to 8 eggs.

== Ecology ==
Though it likes to stay in rivers and streams during the day it prefers large open waters during the night. This duck likes water in the wooded hills of Africa and hides its nest near running water. Also the African black duck makes its cup shaped nest of driftwood and matted grass. Though it builds its nest near water it is always above flood level and on the ground.

== Diet ==
It is an omnivore that feeds off of larvae and pupae usually found under rocks, aquatic animals, plant material, seeds, small fish, snails, and crabs.
