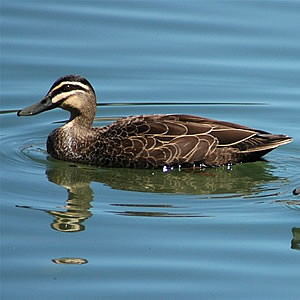
- Pacific black duck (Anas superciliosa)

Scientific classification
- Kingdom: Animalia
- Phylum: Chordata
- Class: Aves
- Order: Anseriformes
- Family: Anatidae
- Subfamily: Anatinae; Leach, 1820

Type species
- Anas platyrhynchos Linnaeus, 1758

Genera
- See text

= Anatinae =

Subfamily of birds

The Anatinae are a subfamily of the family Anatidae (swans, geese, and ducks). Its surviving members are the dabbling ducks, which feed mainly at the surface rather than by diving. The other members of the Anatinae are the extinct moa-nalo, a young but highly apomorphic lineage derived from the dabbling ducks.

Much debate exists about the systematical status and which ducks belong to the Anatinae. Some taxonomic authorities only include the dabbling ducks and their close relatives, the extinct moa-nalos. Alternatively, the Anatinae are considered to include most "ducks", and the dabbling ducks to form a tribe Anatini within these. The classification as presented here more appropriately reflects the remaining uncertainty about the interrelationships of the major lineages of Anatidae (waterfowl).

== Systematics ==
The dabbling duck group, of worldwide distribution, was delimited in a 1986 study to include eight genera and some 50–60 living species. However, Salvadori's teal is almost certainly closely related to the pink-eared duck, and other genera are likewise of unresolved affiliation. The peculiar marbled duck, formerly tentatively assigned to the dabbling ducks, is thought to be a diving duck or even a distinct subfamily.

This group of ducks has been so named because its members feed mainly on vegetable matter by upending on the water surface, or grazing, and only rarely diving. These are mostly gregarious ducks of freshwater or estuaries. These birds are strong fliers and northern species are highly migratory. Compared to other types of ducks, their legs are located more towards the centre of their bodies. They walk well on land, and some species feed terrestrially.

"Puddle ducks" generally feed on the surface of the water or on very shallow bottoms. They are not equipped to dive down several feet like their diving counterparts. The most prominent difference between puddle ducks and divers is the size of the feet. A puddle duck's feet are generally smaller because they do not need the extra propulsion to dive for their forage.

Another distinguishing characteristic of puddle ducks when compared with diving ducks is the way in which they take flight when spooked or are on the move. Puddle ducks spring straight up from the water, but diving ducks need to gain momentum to take off, so they must run across the water a short distance to gain flight.

Traditionally, most ducks were assigned to either the shelducks, the perching ducks, and the dabbling and diving ducks; the latter two were presumed to make up the Anatinae. However, the perching ducks turned out to be a paraphyletic assemblage of various tropical waterfowl that happened to evolve the ability to perch well in their forested habitat. Several of these, such as the Brazilian teal, were subsequently assigned to the Anatinae.

As for the diving ducks, mtDNA cytochrome b and NADH dehydrogenase subunit 2 sequence data indicate that they are fairly distant from the dabbling ducks. The morphological similarities are due to convergent evolution.

In addition, the genus Anas, as traditionally defined, is not monophyletic; several South American species belong to a distinct clade that would include the Tachyeres steamer-ducks. Other species, such as the Baikal teal, should also be considered distinct.

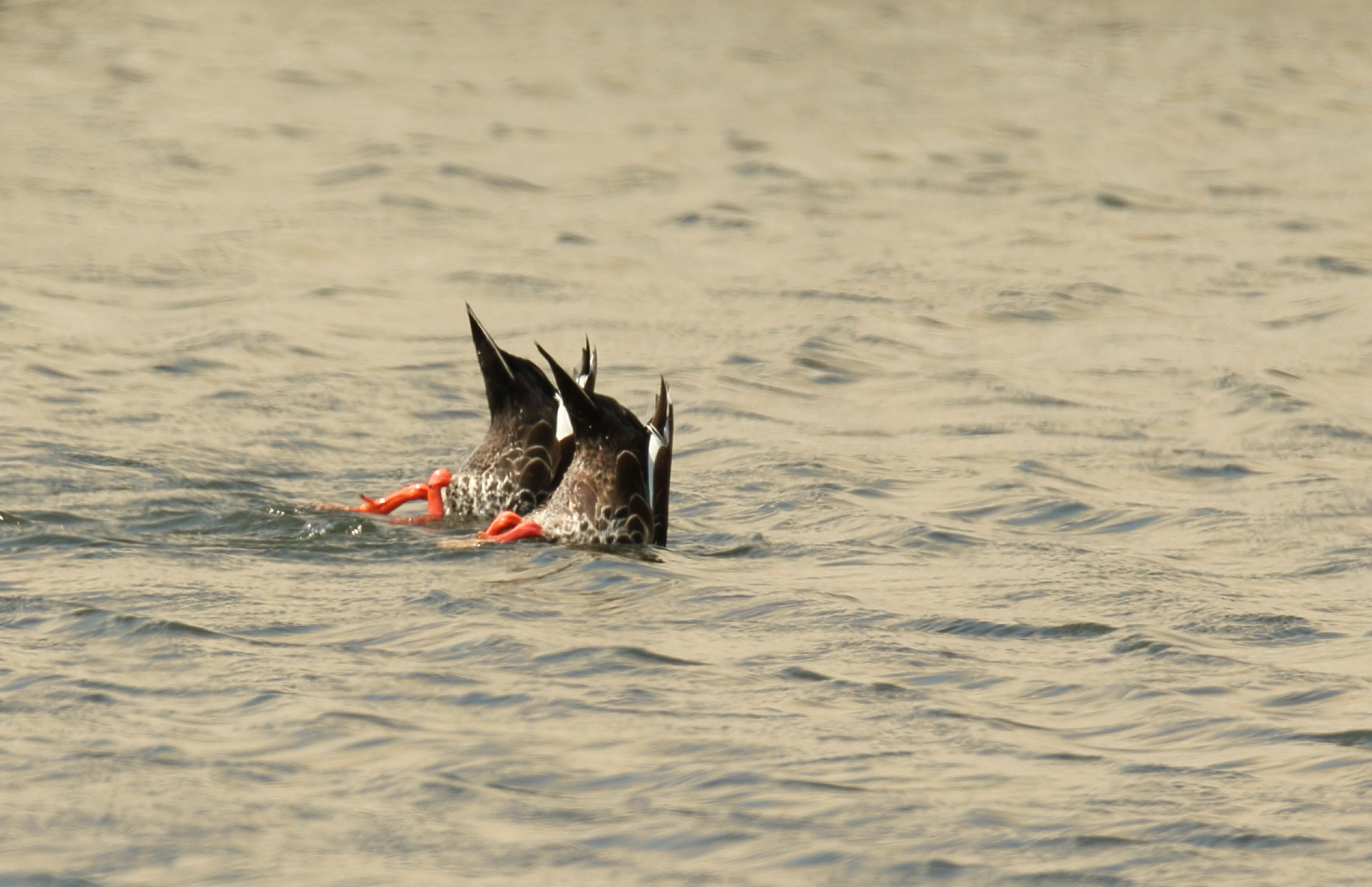
Spot-billed ducks dabbling

== Genera ==
These genera are (with one exception) unequivocally dabbling ducks:

- Amazonetta – status not fully resolved, most likely a dabbling duck
- Sibirionetta – Baikal teal
- Spatula
- Mareca
- Lophonetta – crested duck
- Speculanas – bronze-winged duck
- Anas

The three known genera and four known species of moa-nalos all became extinct around 1000 AD. They formerly occurred on the Hawaiian Islands and were derived from dabbling ducks, possibly even from a close ancestor of the mallard:

- Chelychelynechen
- Thambetochen
- Ptaiochen

Subfossil remains of a small, flightless dabbling duck have been recovered on Rota in the Mariana Islands. These cannot be assigned to a known genus, but probably are closest to Anas. A most bizarre duck-like bird, Talpanas lippa, has been found on the Hawaiian island of Kauai. Because of its unique apomorphies (it seems to have had small eyes high and far back on its head), the placement of this anatid is likewise unresolved; only dabbling ducks and true geese are with certainty known to have colonized the Hawaiian archipelago.

Another bizarre insular anatine was Bambolinetta from the Late Miocene of Tuscana, then part of the Tuscano-Sardinian insular landmass. Flightless or at least a poor flyer, it instead shows adaptations for wing-propelled diving, occupying a similar ecological niche to that of penguins and plotopterids.

Frequently placed into the Anatinae are these genera, whose relationships must be considered uncertain at present:

- †Chenoanas?
- †Dunstanetta (Johnstone's duck)
- †Lavadytis
- †Pinpanetta
- †Tirarinetta
- Oxyurini (stiff-tailed ducks)
  - Heteronetta (black-headed duck)
  - Nomonyx (masked duck)
  - Oxyura
- Biziura – Oxyurini?
- Aix – Tadorninae?
- Cairina – may be paraphyletic, with one species in Tadorninae and the other closer to diving ducks
- Callonetta – Tadorninae?
- Chenonetta – Tadorninae?
- Pteronetta – may belong into a distinct clade with Cyanochen
- Nettapus – part of ancient Gondwanan lineage?
- Mergini - (seaducks)
  - †Chendytes
  - †Shiriyanetta
  - Polysticta
  - Somateria
  - Histrionicus
  - †Camptorhynchus
  - Melanitta
  - Clangula
  - Bucephala
  - Mergellus?
  - Lophodytes?
  - Mergus?

The following genera, though usually considered to belong into the Tadorninae, may actually be dabbling ducks:

- Sarkidiornis
- Tachyeres
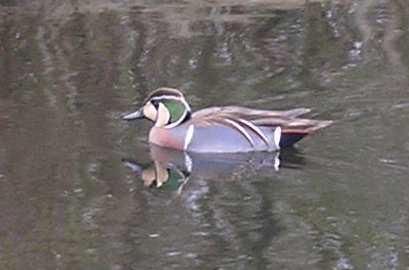
Baikal teal (Sibirionetta formosa)

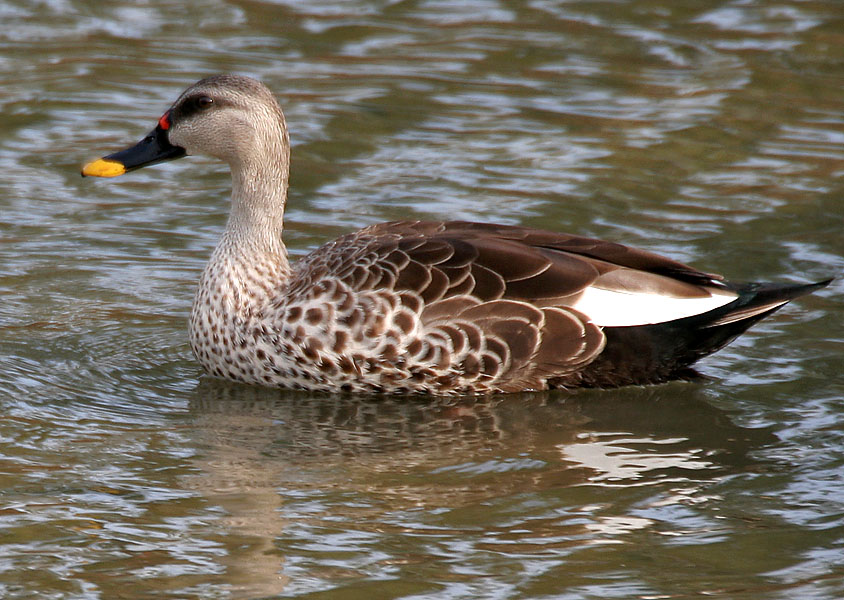
Indian spot-billed duck (Anas poecilorhyncha) in Hyderabad, India

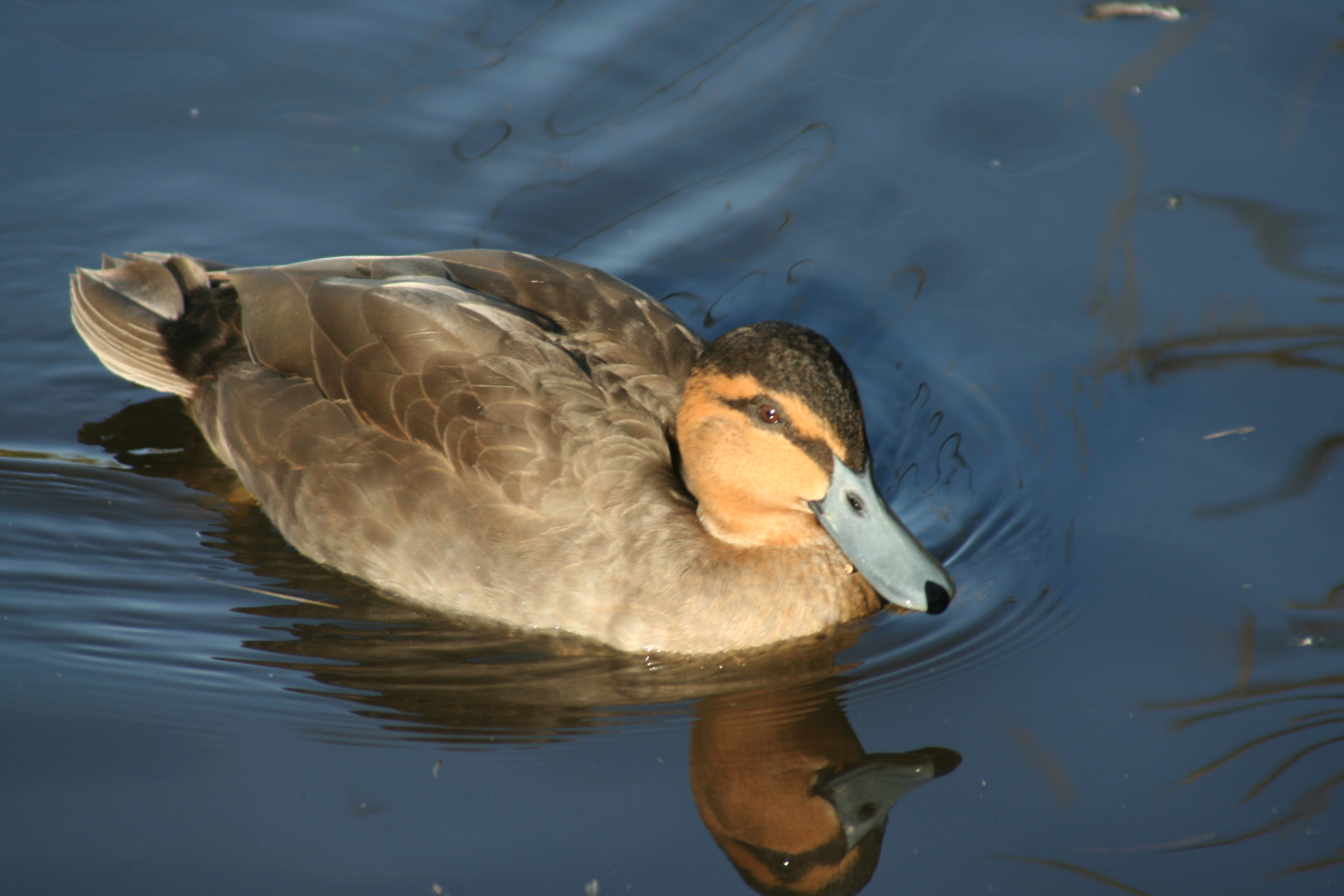
Philippine duck (Anas luzonica)

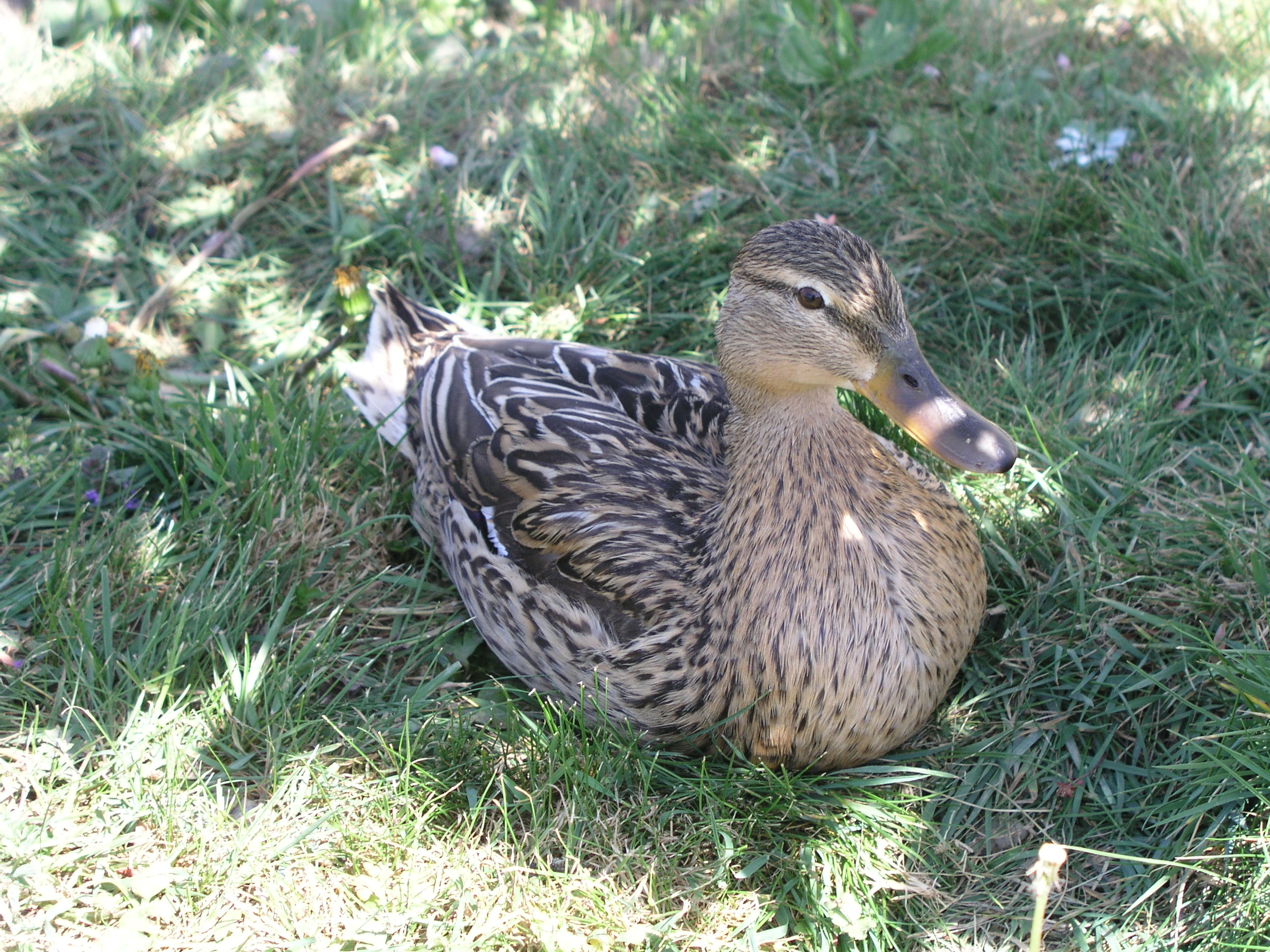
Mallard (Anas platyrhynchos) (female)

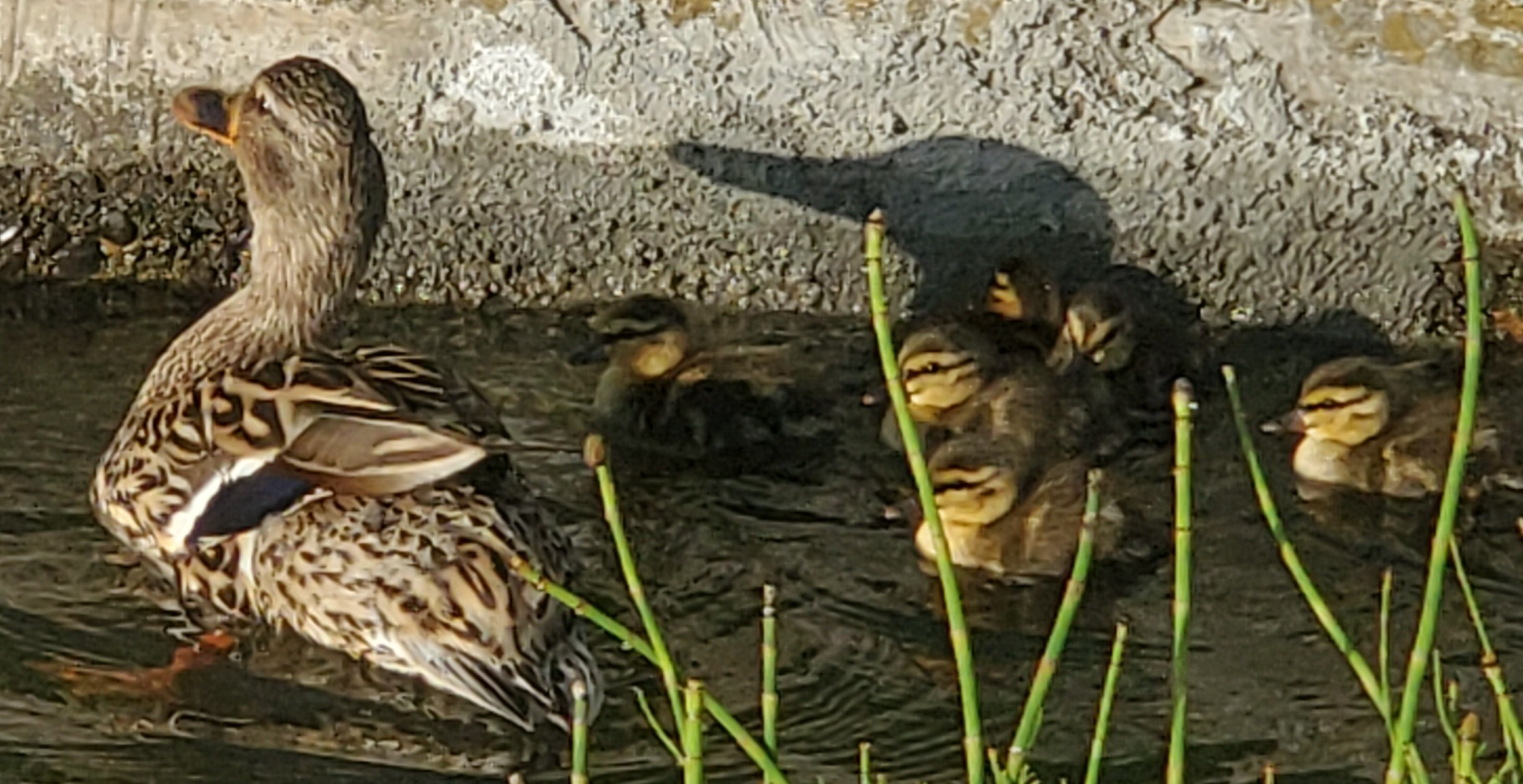
Mallard (Anas platyrhynchos) with six ducklings

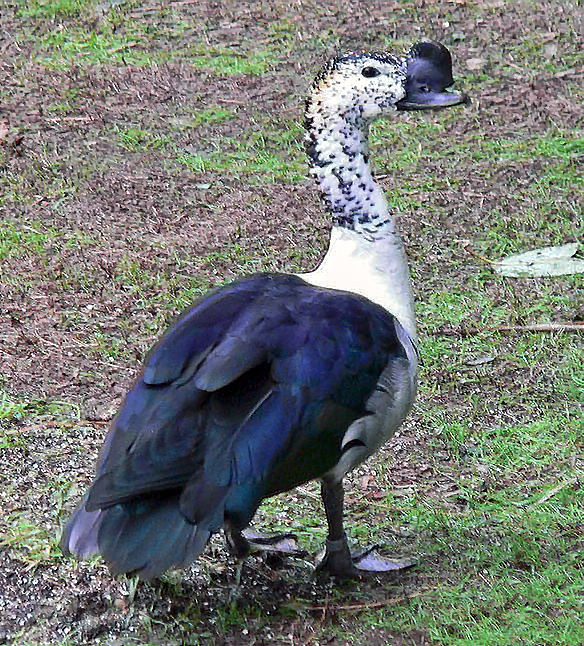
Knob-billed duck (Sarkidiornis melanotos): a misplaced dabbling duck?
