= Theodor Otto Diener =

American plant pathologist (1921–2023)

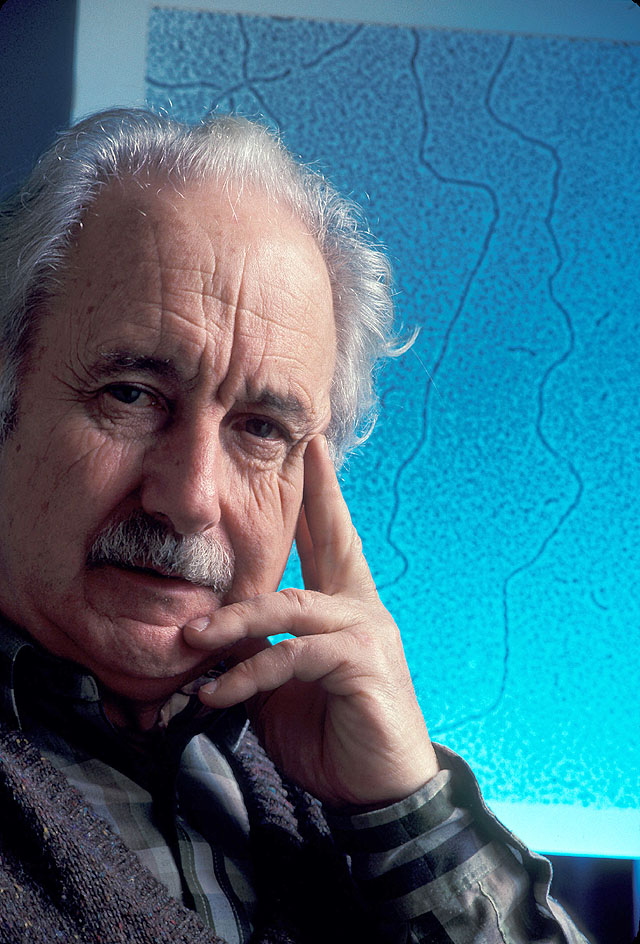
- Diener at the Agricultural Research Service
- Born: 28 February 1921; Zurich, Switzerland
- Died: 28 March 2023 (aged 102); Beltsville, Maryland, U.S.
- Education: Swiss Federal Institute of Technology (Dr. sc. ETH 1946)
- Known for: Discovery of viroids
- Spouses: Shirley Baumann (divorced); Sybil Fox (m. 1968; died 2012)
- Children: 3
- Awards: National Medal of Science (1987)
- Scientific career
- Fields: Plant pathology
- Workplaces: Washington State University; United States Department of Agriculture; Agricultural Research Service

Theodor Otto Diener (28 February 1921 – 28 March 2023) was a Swiss-American plant pathologist who discovered viroids in 1971, recognized by the International Committee on Taxonomy of Viruses as a new order of subviral agents. He discovered that the potato spindle tuber disease is not caused by a virus, unexpectedly, but a short strand of RNA without protein capsid, which he termed viroid. He received the Wolf Prize in Agriculture, the highest in the field.

== Biography ==
Diener was born in Zurich, Switzerland on 28 February 1921. He served as aircraft mechanic for the Swiss Air Force in World War II He attended ETH Zurich, from which he graduated with Dr. sc. ETH degree in 1946. After graduation, he worked as research assistant at Swiss Federal Experiment Station for Viticulture and Horticulture in Wadenswil, Zurich, where on the first day, he discovered the first occurrence of a rust fungus on a cherry tree (Puccinia cerasi on the leaves) in more than 100 years.

In 1949, he emigrated to the United States, where, after a brief tenure at Rhode Island State College, he accepted a position as assistant plant pathologist at Washington State University's outlying Irrigation Experiment Station in Prosser, Washington, where he showed that pipecolic acid (an unusual amino acid) accumulates only in peach leaves with X-disease phytoplasma symptoms and that pipecolic acid causes X-disease phytoplasma symptoms.

Diener was married to Shirley Baumann and had three sons before they divorced. Diener was then married to Sybil Fox from 1968 until her death in 2012. Diener died at his home in Beltsville, Maryland on 28 March 2023 at the age of 102.

Diener published 2 books on viroids, 120 peer-reviewed articles, 53 chapters in books, and lectured on viroids worldwide.

== Viroid ==
In 1959, Diener joined the US Department of Agriculture's Agricultural Research Service Pioneering Laboratory for Plant Virology at the Agricultural Research Service in Beltsville, Maryland, where he investigated the cause of the potato spindle tuber disease. This led to the unexpected discovery of the causative agent, a small RNA molecule, eighty times smaller than the smallest known viruses, for which he proposed the term viroid. Later, viroids were characterized as single stranded covalently closed circular RNA molecules occurring as highly base-paired rod-like structures. Viroids, together with viroid-like satellite RNAs have been officially endorsed by the International Committee on the Taxonomy of Viruses as a new order of subviral agents, which, in its 2014 publication, and as of 2024, encompassed Pospiviroid, Hostuviroid, Cocadviroid, Apscaviroid, Coleviroid genera of the Pospiviroidae family and Avsunviroid, Pelamoviroid, Elaviroid genera of the Avsunviroidae family.

In 1989, Diener hypothesized that the unique properties of viroids make them more plausible candidates as "living relics" of a hypothetical, precellular RNA world than are introns or other RNAs then considered as such. In 2016, Diener reevaluated his hypothesis, both reviewers agreed that Diener's hypothesis was still valid, but alternative hypotheses positing a more recent origin of viroids from cellular RNAs should also be considered.

== Awards and honors ==
- 1968: Campbell Award, American Institute of Biological Sciences
- 1969: Superior Service Award, U.S. Department of Agriculture
- 1973: Fellow Award; American Phytopathological Society
- 1975: Alexander von Humboldt Award, Alexander von Humboldt Society
- 1976: Ruth Allen Award: American Phytopathological Society
- 1977: Elected Member; U.S. National Academy of Sciences
- 1978: Elected Fellow, American Academy of Arts and Sciences
- 1979: Elected Andrew D. White Professor-at-Large, Cornell University
- 1980: Elected member, Leopoldina, German Academy of Sciences
- 1987: Wolf Prize in Agriculture, Wolf Foundation/State of Israel
- 1987: National Medal of Science, USA
- 1988: E.C. Stakman Award, University of Minnesota
- 1988: Distinguished Service Award, Potomac Division, American Phytopathological Society
- 1989: Inducted into Science Hall of Fame, Agricultural Research Service, U.S. Department of Agriculture
- 1989: Named Distinguished Professor, University of Maryland, College Park, MD
- 1994: Named Distinguished Professor Emeritus, University of Maryland, College Park, MD
