= Citrus gummy bark viroid =

Virus classification
- (unranked): Viroid
- Family: Pospiviroidae
- Genus: Hostuviroid
- Species: Hop stunt viroid
- Strain: Citrus gummy bark viroid

Strain of virus

The citrus gummy bark viroid (abbreviated CGBVd) is a strain of Hop stunt viroid, and thus is a member of the genus Hostuviroid.

As the name suggests, the citrus gummy bark viroid causes problems in the bark of the sweet orange tree.

Scraping the bark exposes localized spots or a line of reddish-brown, gum-impregnated tissue around the scion circumference especially visible near the bud union. The discoloration and gumming may extend above the bud union to the main branches of the sweet orange while in severe infection dark streaks of gum-impregnated tissue may also be observed in longitudinal sections.
