= Retrozyme =

Family of retrotransposons

Retrozymes are a family of retrotransposons first discovered in the genomes of plants but now also known in genomes of animals. Retrozymes contain a hammerhead ribozyme (HHR) in their sequences (and so the name retrozyme is a combination of retrotransposon and hammerhead ribozyme), although they do not possess any coding regions. Retrozymes are nonautonomous retroelements, and so borrow proteins from other elements to move into new regions of a genome. Retrozymes are actively transcribed into covalently closed circular RNA (circRNA or cccRNA) and are detected in both polarities, which may indicate the use of rolling circle replication in their lifecycle.

The genomic structure of a retrozyme in plants involves a central non-coding region that may stretch about 300–600nt flanked by long terminal repeats about 300–400nt containing the HHR motif. They also have two sequences (a primer binding site (PBS) complementary to the tRNA-Met sequence and a poly-purine tract (PPT)) needed to prime DNA synthesis during mobilization. The most distinguishing feature of the retrozyme compared with other elements of plant genomes are the hammerhead ribozyme. Otherwise, they resemble other known features of plant genomes such as terminal-repeat retrotransposons in miniature (TRIM) and small LTR retrotransposons (SMART). The PBS, PPT, and the HHR motif are the only parts of the retrozyme sequences which shows conservation and homology. Currently, it is thought retrozymes evolved from a large retrotransposon family known across many eukaryotes as the Penelope-like elements (PLE). Retrozymes share a number of peculiar features with PLE, including a type I HHR, occurrence as tandem copies, and co-existence in all analyzed metazoans to date.

Retrozymes are presently known to reach sequence sizes as small as 170nt and as big as 1,116nt. Smaller retrozymes are typically found in invertebrates, such as a 300nt retrozyme in the genome of the Mediterranean mussel (Mytilus galloprovincialis). The largest known retrozyme is 1,116nt in length, discovered in the genome of a strain of Jatropha curcas.

Presently, the only database for retrozymes and similar elements is ViroidDB, which currently contains sequences of 73 retrozymes taken from the National Center for Biotechnology Information nucleotide database. Sequences of retrozymes in particular were initially directly and separately found and downloaded from GenBank, as retrozymes currently have no taxonomic classification. Some methods have been developed to study retrozymes in the laboratory.

== Traits ==
Retrozymes differentially accumulate in different tissues of plants. Furthermore, the domesticated equivalents of some species of plants contain substantially fewer copies of retrozymes, indicating that domestication applies a negative selection pressure on retrozyme sequences. Another interesting trait of retrozymes in plants is their active transcription, even though the majority of retrotransposons are inactive.

The smallest known retrozymes are those found in invertebrates, where they can range from 170–400nt. They appear to be expressed in, at the least, most cell types. Just as with plants, retrozymes in animals are also expressed at high levels in both somatic cells and germ cells. While retrozymes have been found in both linear and circularized forms, levels of circularized retrozymes have been seen much more abundantly in vivo and the linear forms may be a product of self-cleavage by the HHR motif during replication or a result of spontaneous breakage during purification.

Animal retrozymes have several differences with plant retrozymes. Different proteins circularize and reversibly transcribe plant and animal retrozymes during the replication cycle. Animal retrozymes lack all the characteristic long-terminal repeats, PBS, and PPT known in plant retrozymes. And while plant retrozymes only have one or two copies of the HHR motif, animal retrozymes may have many such copies. Animal retrozymes also have smaller tandem repeats that are often flanked by target side duplications (TSD). TSD in animals are typically 8–12bp, slightly larger than the 4bp TSD found in plants.

== Replication cycle ==
The retrozyme sequence is first transcribed by a polymerase in the host. The product is an oligomeric RNA sequence which is a single transcript containing multiple copies of the retrozyme sequence. The hammerhead ribozyme motif then autocatalytically performs self-cleavage to separate the oligomeric transcript into several monomeric transcripts, each containing only one copy of the retrozyme sequence. This copy is an intermediate of the replication cycle, containing the opposite polarity of the original sequence with a 5'-hydroxyl and a 2'-3'-cyclic phosphate ends. A ligase protein in the host may then circularize this intermediate into a stable, circular RNA molecule. In plants, this ligase is a chloroplast tRNA ligase. Dependence on chloroplast tRNA ligase for circularization is also seen in the Avsunviroidae family of viroids. In animals, the ligase is an RtcB tRNA ligase. Reverse transcriptase activity is required from a different retrotransposon to generate a corresponding complementary DNA of the retrozyme RNA, and the polarity of this cDNA corresponds to the polarity of the original sequence. Plant and animal retrozymes rely on different retrotransposons to produce a cDNA copy of their RNA molecule. In plants, LTR retrotransposons of the Gypsy family are used. Although it is not clear which type of retrotransposons are relied on in animals, these could be classes such as LINE or PLE. After the DNA copy has been produced, the retrozyme sequence has the opportunity to re-insert itself into a genomic loci.

== Relationships with mobile genetic elements ==
Retrozymes possess close similarities to types of mobile genetic elements (MGE), especially viroids, satellite RNA (satRNA), and Ribozyviria (a recently described realm of viruses). For one, the hammerhead ribozyme (HHR) motif is found in all these elements. These elements also replicate through rolling circle replication, where the HHR motif plays the autocatalytic role of cleaving the circular RNA molecule at a conserved site. Furthermore, all these elements depend on a host polymerase to transcribe their sequence and a ligase to recircularize them into a circular RNA molecule. Retrozymes form branched conformations, as do some satRNA and Avsunviroidae (one of the two classes of viroids).

Due to their simplicity, many have suggested that viroids originated and are remnants of the RNA world. Other suggestions include that viroids derive from other viruses, having degenerated in size and lost any protein-coding genes. Several challenges have been raised to these suggestions. The limited range of viroids and satellite RNAs in flowering plants (with none discovered in bacteria and archaea) indicates that their origins post-date the emergence of eukaryotes. The recent discovery and advances related to retrozymes have led to the current hypothesis that retrozymes were the source of the origins of viroids and satRNA. The relationship with ribozyviruses is less straight forward. Ribozyviruses are more complex than retrozymes, viroids, and satellites. They are the only viroid-like element to harbour a protein-coding gene. This gene codes for a capsid which undergoes post-translational modifications to give rise to different forms which together perform a variety of functions in the host, enabling their lifecycle. Furthermore, ribozyviruses are only found narrowly in animal lineages whereas both viroids and satellite RNA are only known to be infectious in plants. The narrow spread of ribozyviruses in animals, combined with strong evidence for the origins of viroids in plants, suggests that ribozyviruses are the more recent class of MGE. Ribozyviruses may have emerged from viroids and then transferred into animals through horizontal gene transfer, at some point acquiring a protein-coding gene. Alternatively, because retrozymes are known in both plants and animals, retrozymes may have independently given rise to ribozyviruses in animal lineages. It is unclear if viroids and other viroid-like elements emerged from retrozymes once or several times, and while they are unlikely to trace back to RNA world, some still stress their importance as minimal replicators close to the theoretical lower limit of replicator size.

== See also ==
- Hammerhead ribozyme
- Retrotransposon
- Ribozyviria
- Satellite (biology)
- Viroid
- Virus
