= Bunchy top =

Bunchy top most commonly refers to:

- Banana bunchy top virus and its concomitant disease.

It is also the short name of several other plant diseases including:

- Papaya Bunchy Top Disease
- Abaca bunchy top virus
- Potato spindle tuber viroid which produces Tomato bunchy top
- Citrus exocortis which produces Indian bunchy top in tomato
