= Peach latent mosaic viroid =

Virus classification
- Informal group: Subviral agents
- Informal group: Viroids
- Family: Avsunviroidae
- Genus: Pelamoviroid
- Species: Peach latent mosaic viroid

Species of virus

Peach latent mosaic viroid (binomial name Pelamoviroid latenspruni)(PLMVd) is a species of the genus Pelamoviroid, which belongs to the family Avsunviroidae. This family is characterized as having chloroplastic viroids with hammerhead ribozymes. In other words, these viruses are known to localize within the chloroplasts of plant cells and utilize hammerhead ribozymes to mediate self-cleavage and ligation of replication intermediates. Peach latent mosaic viroid was first described in the 1980s in Spain by a group of scientists.It is present in all peach- and nectarine-producing areas of the world including Europe, Asia, North America and South America and the frequency of naturally occurring infection is high.

Before the development of symptoms the disease is latent in peach trees for approximately 5–7 years. The symptoms of the disease include necrosis of buds, delayed shoot development, necrotic branches, premature ageing of trees, flower streaking, ripening deformations, enlarged rounded stones, circular discolored areas on the fruit skin and in some cases mosaic, blotch, vein banding or calico appearance on infected leaves.

An interesting biochemical property is that PLMVd has reduced solubility in highly saline conditions (e.g. 2 M LiCl), which is thought to relate to its branched structure. Some studies suggest the existence of a 2′,5′-phosphodiester bond in circular forms, possibly contributing to structural stability and influencing cleavage/ligation balance.

== Transmission ==
PLMVd is horizontally spread by propagation of infected buds (greatest risk) , contaminated pruning tools and green peach aphids. Aphids are known to spread viroids through their feeding habitats and this has shown to occur with PLMVd. Therefore, practices that cause mechanical damage (pruning, grafting), pollen movement (wind, insects), and handling of propagation material can influence transmission rates.

More recent information indicates that transmission may also occur through pollen. Studies show PLMVd is localized both inside and outside pollen grains and subsequent exposure of viroid filled pollen results in infection. Vertical transmission of peach latent mosaic viroid through seeds can not occur

Additionally, viroids can travel systemically spreading locally through plasmodesmata and over longer distances via the phloem.

=== Transmission pathways ===
- Vegetative propagation / grafting: Infected budwood or scion material is a key vector for spreading PLMVd.
- Mechanical transmission: Pruning tools or knives contaminated with sap can carry viroid RNA from plant to plant.
- Aphid transmission: The green peach aphid Myzus persicae is implicated in field transmission (noncirculative / mechanical mode).
- Pollen transmission: Some studies report that PLMVd can be transmitted via infected pollen.

== Hosts and distribution ==
=== Host range ===
The primary host is peach (Prunus persica) and nectarine, but PLMVd has also been detected in other Prunus species (apricot, cherry, plum, peach hybrids). In a notable extension, PLMVd was also reported in nontraditional hosts of apples (Malus domestica) and pears (Pyrus communis) in Egypt, causing bark canker, fruit streaking, and scab-type symptoms.

=== Geographic distribution ===
PLMVd is present in all major peach- and nectarine-growing regions worldwide, including Europe, Asia, North America, and South America.

Recent surveys have expanded on this known distribution:

- In southeastern Kazakhstan, PLMVd was detected in ~8.13 % of sampled stone fruit trees (15/78 peaches, 5/74 apricots), presenting with moderate symptoms.
- In China, a calico (albino) phenotype (PC) isolate was characterized in Prunus persica plants, representing a more symptomatic form of the viroid first detected here in 2019.

== Symptoms, disease, and impact ==
=== Symptoms ===
In many infections, PLMVd remains latent (i.e., no obvious symptoms) for several years, often 5–7 years, before symptoms appear. If Symptoms do occur these may include:

- Leaf mosaic, blotches, calico (whitening) or chlorotic patterns
- Flower streaking
- Delays in leafing, flowering, and fruiting
- Fruit deformities: discolored patches, cracked sutures, misshapen fruit
- Enlarged, rounded stones (pits)
- Necrosis of buds
- Stem pitting or wood alteration
- Premature aging of trees
- Growth habit changes (open canopy)

The extreme symptom "peach calico" is associated with variants carrying specific insertions; in those cases, large sectors or whole leaves may become albino or chlorotic.

=== Disease impact and economic importance ===
In many jurisdictions, PLMVd is considered a quarantine or regulated pathogen, and inspection and testing requirements are imposed for Prunus persica propagation material.

But, because many infections are asymptomatic, PLMVd is often latent and undetected. Still, infection can alter tree success, shorten the productive lifespan of orchards, reduce fruit quality (making fruits unmarketable), and ultimately make trees more susceptible to secondary stresses. Detection is complex due to symptomatic diversity and variants in genome sequences between viroids. The continued identification of PLMVd in new geographic regions and fruit cultivars highlights the ongoing impacts caused by this viroid. Given the potential economic and environmental consequences of its continued spread, enhanced surveillance and preventive measures are warranted.

== Genome/replication ==
Peach latent mosaic viroid has a 336-351nt circular RNA genome which is organized in a branched formation. This branched formation is stabilized by a pseudoknot between two kissing loops. This branched structure makes these viroids insoluble in Lithium Chloride unlike others. Additionally, this form is distinct from the rod-like structures of other viroids and is essential for ribozyme activity and replication in chloroplasts. Particularly, the branched formation allows hammerhead ribozymes to form in both (+) and (–) strands for self-cleavage during rolling-circle replication and may facilitate interactions with chloroplast-localized host factors. During this replication and cleaving process, it has been shown that no multimeric (numerous linked repeats) intermediates are produced, depicting an efficient cleavage process. The defining trait of viruses belonging to this family, including PLMVd, is that they replicate in chloroplasts, not the nucleus (contrast with Pospiviroidae. Findings of PLMVd replication indicate that viroid derived mechanisms instead of host dependent enzymes.

== Biology, replication, and mechanisms ==
=== Host-viroid interactions ===
Because PLMVd does not encode proteins, its life cycle depends almost entirely on host factors, with the exception of its RNA Synthesis. A study using peach leaf extracts identified several RNA-binding proteins interacting with PLMVd, including elongation factor 1-alpha (eEF1A).

=== Population dynamics and sequence variability ===
PLMVd exists as a quasispecies—a population of closely related sequence variants within the same host. Deep sequencing studies have revealed extensive heterogeneity: in one experiment, almost 4,000 distinct circular variants were recovered from a single infected genotype, with up to ~17 % divergence from the inoculated variant.

On average, variants differed by 4.6 to 6.4 point mutations from the progenitor sequence. Hierarchical clustering grouped them into discrete clusters, allowing inference of sequence evolution trajectories.

Some phenotypic variants (notably those causing the "calico" or albino symptom) carry characteristic insertions (12–14 nt hairpin) that appear to be pathogenicity determinants. In a Chinese study, the PC-A2 isolate (with a hairpin insertion) and its progeny showed divergence from known Italian and South Korean PC isolates.
