= Grapevine yellow speckle viroid =

Grapevine yellow speckle viroid can refer to two different species of viroid, both in the genus Apscaviroid:

- Grapevine yellow speckle viroid 1
- Grapevine yellow speckle viroid 2
