= Pospiviroid RY motif stem loop =

RNA element found in Pospiviroids such as potato spindle tuber viroid (PSTVd)

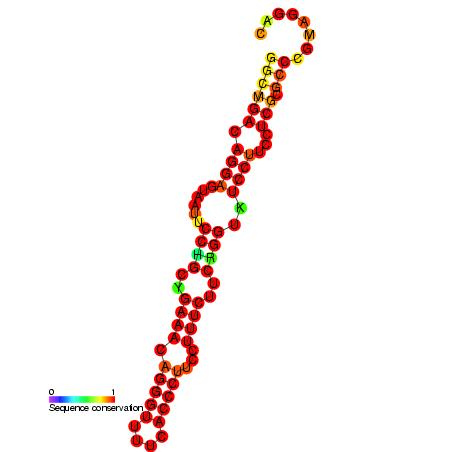
- Predicted secondary structure and sequence conservation of Pospi_RY

Identifiers
- Symbol: Pospi_RY
- Rfam: RF00362

Other data
- RNA type: Cis-reg
- Domain(s): Viroids
- SO: SO:0000233
- PDB structures: PDBe

The Pospiviroid RY motif stem loop is an RNA element found in Pospiviroids such as potato spindle tuber viroid (PSTVd). The RY nucleotide sequence motif (5'-ACAGG and CUCUUCC-5') in PSTVd, is thought to bind with the tomato protein Virp1. The exact function of this motif and the significance of Virp1 binding is unknown. It is however thought that RY motifs are essential for establishing a viroid infection.
