= AGV =

AGV, or agv, may refer to:

- AGV (helmet manufacturer), an Italian motorcycle helmet firm
- Oswaldo Guevara Mujica Airport in Portuguesa state, Venezuela (IATA code "AGV")
- Remontado Agta language spoken in parts of the Philippines (ISO 639-3 code "agv")
- Abergavenny railway station, Wales, UK (National Rail code "AGV")
- AGV (train), a high-speed multiple-unit train built by Alstom
- Attorney-General of Victoria
- Attorney General of Virginia
- Australian grapevine viroid, a plant viroid
- Automated Guided Vehicle, a mobile robot used in industrial applications to move materials around
