= Obelisk (biology) =

Phylogenetic group described in January 2024

An obelisk is a microscopic genetic element that consists of a type of infectious agent composed of RNA. Described as "viroid-like elements", obelisks consist of RNA in a circular rod shape without any protein shell coating.

Obelisks were identified in 2024 by Ivan Zheludev and colleagues through computational analysis of vast genetic datasets. Their RNA sequences are entirely novel, and their placement within the tree of life remains uncertain as they do not appear to have a shared ancestry with any other life form, virus, or viroid. Obelisks are currently classified as an enigmatic taxon, forming a distinct phylogenetic group.

== Discovery ==
Obelisks were first described in a January 2024 preprint, later published in Cell, by scientists which sifted through genetic data. Currently, only a few methods are available for the identification of these elements from NGS data. The authors of the paper say that "Obelisks form their own distinct phylogenetic group", as their RNA sequences, discovered by computer-aided metatranscriptomics, are not homologous with the genomic sequence of any other life form. With their relationship to other organisms being unknown, they are an example of the incertae sedis, or "enigmatic taxa".

The authors named these sequences "obelisks" due to a predicted obelisk-shaped RNA secondary structure: "At 1164 nt [nucleotides] in length, the rod-like secondary structure was striking [...]"

Viroids were known to be aggressive plant pathogens, and there had been no evidence to suggest that they were ever present in animals or bacteria. This paper marks the first time a viroid or viroid-like object has been found in bacteria or animals.

== Distribution and pathology ==
Obelisks have been found in human stool samples, and inside specimens of Streptococcus sanguinis, a species of bacteria, taken from human mouths. Some human subjects hosted obelisks for more than 300 days. The initial study showed the presence of obelisks in about 7 percent of the stool samples, and about 50 percent of saliva samples, surveying individuals globally.

The effect of obelisks on human health, if any, is yet to be determined, as are issues such as their life cycles, and what factors their replication depend on.

They have been detected in hot springs and oceans. A total of 55 obelisk sequences have been identified across all oceans and depths, with the highest abundances found at the deep chlorophyll maximum. Obelisks were present in both prokaryotic and eukaryotic data, but were far more abundant in the former, suggesting replication occurs in prokaryotic hosts. Furthermore, within prokaryotes they were present in quantities equal to or exceeding uncultured RNA viruses. Though their interactions with their hosts are still poorly understood, these findings highlight that obelisks may be a significant but unrecognised component of the ecosystem.

== Genetics and biochemistry ==
Features of obelisks include circular RNA genome assemblies with around 1000 base pairs, and rod-like secondary structures that encompass the entire genome. In contrast to viroids, their RNA is translated into proteins, tentatively called "oblins". The two proteins identified in the initial discovery were Oblin-1 and Oblin-2. Oblin-1 is broadly conserved, while the presence of other proteins varies within obelisk subfamilies. This may show that only Oblin-1 is essential for replication, while other proteins are involved in host-specific interactions.

First structural predictions say that Oblin-1 can bind metal ions and thus could be involved in cellular signalling. Oblin-2 features a binding site which is typical of protein complexes, and might therefore bind to enzymes of its host cell.

== See also ==
- Metatranscriptomics
- Non-cellular life
