= Australian grapevine viroid =

Virus classification
- Informal group: Subviral agents
- Informal group: Viroids
- Family: Pospiviroidae
- Genus: Hostuviroid
- Species: Hop stunt viroid
- Strain: Australian grapevine viroid

Strain of viroid

The Australian grapevine viroid (abbreviated AGV), binomial name Apscaviroid austravitis, is a type of grapevine viroid.

== See also ==
- List of viruses
