= Hop latent viroid =

Virus classification
- Informal group: Subviral agents
- Informal group: Viroids
- Family: Pospiviroidae
- Genus: Cocadviroid
- Species: Hop latent viroid

Viroid infecting hop, hemp and cannabis

Hop latent viroid (abbreviated HpLVd, or HLVd, binomial Cocadviroid latenshumuli) is a viroid, which is known to cause the Dudding Disease in hemp and cannabis. It is a non-capsulated strand of RNA and an obligate parasite that requires the presence of a compatible host for its survivability. It can have minor effects on hop quality, but has shown to cause severe stunting in hemp and cannabis. Due to its ability to remain undetected, it has become an issue of significant risk for some hemp and cannabis cultivars. Studies regarding this viroid and its ability to infiltrate its plant host are well underway; however, addressing measures to reduce its introduction into growing environments is still challenging.

== Transmission ==
HLVd has the potential to spread across long distances and may infiltrate hop fields through the use of infected propagation materials. Within hop fields, HLVd spreads mechanically, through processes such as grafting and vegetative propagation, as well as via the use of tools or equipment that are contaminated. The spread of HLVd in cannabis production may follow the same transmission patterns as known for hop production thus it is recommended to pay attention to clean management and infection free planting material.

== Effects on plant ==
Plants affected by hop latent viroid may display stunted growth, brittle stems, and reduced foliage; symptoms result from RNA of the viroid disrupting the plant metabolites. These symptoms are reflected in the plant's foliage as trichome development becomes uneven and leaves develop chlorosis. Unfortunately, there are no signs to pre-diagnose the viroid-infected plant, so the plant's physiology and yield quality are indicators.

== Management ==
Critical practices in managing hop latent viroid involve narrowing down the viroid-infected plant before introducing it to a growing environment. Cannabis and hemp are grown from propagules obtained from a mother plant; verifying if the mother plant is diseased is essential to avoid propagating that plant. Testing plant material or residues for HLVd infections can be accomplished by isolating total RNA and subsequent PCR testing. Monitoring the plant's development (height and foliage) and identifying any abnormalities could indicate the presence of the viroid (for newly introduced plants). However, as previously mentioned, the viroid can go undetected, and growing these plants requires mechanical practices. Tools for any conducted procedure must be carefully sanitized with a solution of 10% bleach to kill off hop-latent viroid (if potentially present) before and after usage.

Research with HLVd-infected hop plants has shown that HLVd can be partially degraded through biogas fermentation and high-temperature pretreatment, highlighting potential methods for viroid decontamination in hop production.

== External sources ==
- Dorantes, Oscar Armando (June 2021). "Fool's Gold: Diseased Marijuana and Cannabis Hyperemesis Syndrome". J Investig Med. 69 (5): 1063–1064. doi:10.1136/jim-2021-001980. PMC 8223652. PMID 34074707.
- "Hop Latent Viroid in Cannabis". Medicinal Genomics, 4 Mar. 2023
- Scheck, Heather. "Hop Latent Viroid". Pest Rating Proposals and Final Ratings, 29 Apr. 2022.
- Wilson, Tim. "The Hop Latent Viroid's Warning Shot to the Canadian Cannabis Industry". StratCann, 1 Apr. 2021.
