= Pospiviroid =

Virus classification
- Informal group: Subviral agents
- Informal group: Viroids
- Family: Pospiviroidae
- Genus: Pospiviroid

Species
- Chrysanthemum stunt viroid; Citrus exocortis viroid; Columnea latent viroid; Iresine viroid 1; Pepper chat fruit viroid; Pospiviroid plvd; Potato spindle tuber viroid; Tomato apical stunt viroid; Tomato chlorotic dwarf viroid; Tomato planta macho viroid

Genus of viroids

Pospiviroid is a genus of ssRNA viroids that infects plants, most commonly tubers. It belongs to the family Pospiviroidae. The first viroid discovered was a pospiviroid, the PSTVd species (potato spindle tuber viroid).

== Taxonomy ==
Pospiviroid has 10 virus species

Name	Abbr	GenBank	REFSEQ
Chrysanthemum stunt viroid	CSVd	V01107	NC_002015
Citrus exocortis viroid	CEVd	J02053	NC_001464
Columnea latent viroid	CLVd	X15663	NC_003538
Iresine viroid 1	IrVd1	X95734	NC_003613
Pepper chat fruit viroid	PCFVd	FJ409044	NC_011590
Pospiviroid plvd	PLVd	KR677387	NC_027432
Potato spindle tuber viroid	PSTVd	V01465	NC_002030
Tomato apical stunt viroid	TASVd	K00818	NC_001553
Tomato chlorotic dwarf viroid	TCDVd	AF162131	NC_000885
Tomato planta macho viroid	TPMVd	K00817	NC_001558
