= Avocado sunblotch viroid =

Virus classification
- Informal group: Subviral agents
- Informal group: Viroids
- Family: Avsunviroidae
- Genus: Avsunviroid
- Species: Avocado sunblotch viroid

Species of viroid

Avocado sunblotch viroid (ASBV, Avsunviroid albamaculaperseae) is a disease affecting avocado trees.

Infections result in lower yields and poorer quality fruit. ASBV is the smallest known viroid that infects plants and is transmitted by pollen and infected seeds or budwood.

Trees infected with the viroid often show no symptoms other than a reduction in yield, (by 30% or more). However, they are still carriers and can pass the disease onto other plants. Symptoms in more serious infections include depressed longitudinal streaks of yellow in the fruit. The fruit may also become red or white in colour. Symptoms in the leaf are uncommon but include bleached veins and petioles. Rectangular cracking patterns also occur in the bark of older branches.

The amount (titre) of viroid particles present in avocado trees varies a great deal. Viroids levels can vary by 1000 times between branches on the same tree and by 10000 times between trees. Infected but symptomless trees have a higher concentration of viroid particles than those showing symptoms. Symptomless trees also represent a greater danger in terms of spread of the viroid.

PCR is used to detect infection.
