= Grapevine yellow speckle viroid 1 =

Virus classification
- Informal group: Subviral agents
- Informal group: Viroids
- Family: Pospiviroidae
- Genus: Apscaviroid
- Species: Grapevine yellow speckle viroid 1

Species of viroid

Grapevine yellow speckle viroid 1 (Apscaviroid alphaflavivitis) is a type of viroid that infects grapevine. While this viroid may infect a vine, its host may not express symptoms. According to one study, mutations of the genome of Apscaviroid alphaflavivitis are responsible for the expression of symptoms appearing. Without this mutation, it is likely no symptoms would be expressed. Unlike this viroid's twin, GYSVd-2, Apscaviroid alphaflavivitis can survive at and above 35 °C, and warm climate is actually a key part in causing symptomes in its host. A publication from 2014 suggests that numbers of Apscaviroid alphaflavivitis infections could grow as temperatures get warmer.
