= Citrus exocortis =

Citrus exocortis viroid

Virus classification
- (unranked): Viroid
- Family: Pospiviroidae
- Genus: Pospiviroid
- Species: Citrus exocortis viroid

Disease of citrus plants

Citrus exocortis is a disease of citrus plants, caused by the Citrus exocortis viroid (CEVd, Pospiviroid exocortiscitri). It can cause stunted growth and reduced yields in affected plants. The disease is also sometimes called "scalybutt". CEVd can also infect tomato plants. The resulting disease is sometimes called "tomato bunchy top disease".

== Symptoms ==
Other symptoms include leaf epinasty, stunting, and necrosis of the leaf midvein. Affected trees will show rootstock "shelling" where the bark peels off of the rootstock – the lower tree that the main orange cultivar was grafted onto. Generally trifoliate orange rootstocks and their hybrids are susceptible.

== Management ==
Infected trees should be culled from the orchard. When pruning in infected orchards, tools must be vigorously bleached between cuts to prevent cross-contamination and the spread of infections. Heat does not kill the viroid.

== See also ==
- List of citrus diseases
