= Viroid =

Viroids

Virus classification
- Informal group: Subviral agents
- Informal group: Viroids

Families
- Pospiviroidae; Avsunviroidae

Pathogenic small single-stranded circular RNA

Viroids are small single-stranded, circular RNAs that are infectious pathogens. Unlike viruses, they have no protein coating. A 2023 metatranscriptomics study suggests that viroids and viroid-like elements can be found in all domains of life.

The first discoveries of viroids in the 1970s triggered the historically third major extension of the biosphere—to include smaller entities—after the discoveries in 1675 by Antonie van Leeuwenhoek (of the "subvisible" protozoa) and in 1892–1898 by Dmitri Iosifovich Ivanovsky and Martinus Beijerinck (of the "submicroscopic" viruses). The unique properties of viroids have been recognized by the International Committee on Taxonomy of Viruses, in creating a new order of subviral agents.

The first recognized viroid, the pathogenic agent of the potato spindle tuber disease, was discovered, initially molecularly characterized, and named by Theodor Otto Diener, a plant pathologist at the U.S Department of Agriculture's Research Center in Beltsville, Maryland, in 1971. This viroid is now called potato spindle tuber viroid, abbreviated PSTVd. The Citrus exocortis viroid (CEVd) was discovered soon thereafter, and together understanding of PSTVd and CEVd shaped the concept of the viroid.

Although viroids are composed of nucleic acid, they do not code for any protein. The viroid's replication mechanism uses RNA polymerase II, a host cell enzyme normally associated with synthesis of messenger RNA from DNA, which instead catalyzes "rolling circle" synthesis of new RNA using the viroid's RNA as a template. Viroids are often ribozymes, having catalytic properties that allow self-cleavage and ligation of unit-size genomes from larger replication intermediates.

Diener initially hypothesized in 1989 that viroids may represent "living relics" from the widely assumed, ancient, and non-cellular RNA world, and others have followed this conjecture. Following the discovery of retrozymes, it has been proposed that viroids and other viroid-like elements may derive from this newly found class of retrotransposon.

== Taxonomy ==
Putative secondary structure of the PSTVd viroid. The highlighted nucleotides are found in most other viroids.

As of 2024:

- Family Pospiviroidae: relies on host Rnase III
  - Genus Pospiviroid; type species: Pospiviroid fusituberis (former name Potato spindle tuber viroid); 356–361 nucleotides(nt)
    - Pospiviroid chloronani (former name Tomato chlorotic dwarf viroid); (TCDVd); accession AF162131, genome length 360nt
    - Mexican papita viroid; (MPVd); accession L78454, genome length 360nt
    - Pospiviroid machoplantae (former name Tomato planta macho viroid); (TPMVd); accession K00817, genome length 360nt
    - Pospiviroid exocortiscitri (former name Citrus exocortis viroid); 368–467 nt
    - Pospiviroid impedichrysanthemi (former name Chrysanthemum stunt viroid); (CSVd); accession V01107, genome length 356nt
    - Pospiviroid apicimpeditum (former name Tomato apical stunt viroid); (TASVd); accession K00818, genome length 360nt
    - Pospiviroid alphairesinis (former name Iresine 1 viroid); (IrVd-1); accession X95734, genome length 370nt
    - Pospiviroid latenscolumneae (former name Columnea latent viroid); (CLVd); accession X15663, genome length 370nt
    - Pospiviroid latensportulacae (former name Pospiviroid plvd)
    - Pospiviroid parvicapsici (former name Pepper chat fruit viroid)
  - Genus Hostuviroid; type species: Hostuviroid impedihumuli (former name Hop stunt viroid); 294–303 nt
    - Hostuviroid latensdahliae (former name Dahlia latent viroid)
  - Genus Cocadviroid; type species: Cocadviroid cadangi (former name Coconut cadang-cadang viroid); 246–247 nt
    - Cocadviroid tinangajae (former name Coconut tinangaja viroid); (CTiVd); accession M20731, genome length 254nt
    - Cocadviroid latenshumuli (former name Hop latent viroid); (HLVd); accession X07397, genome length 256nt
    - Cocadviroid rimocitri (former names Citrus bark cracking viroid, Citrus IV viroid); (CVd-IV); accession X14638, genome length 284nt
  - Genus Apscaviroid; type species: Apscaviroid cicatricimali (former name Apple scar skin viroid); 329–334 nt
    - Citrus III viroid; (CVd-III); accession AF184147, genome length 294nt
    - Apscaviroid fossulamali (former name Apple dimple fruit viroid); (ADFVd); accession X99487, genome length 306nt
    - Apscaviroid alphaflavivitis (former name Grapevine yellow speckle viroid 1); (GVYSd-1); accession X06904, genome length 367nt
    - Apscaviroid betaflavivitis (former name Grapevine yellow speckle viroid 2); (GVYSd-2); accession J04348, genome length 363nt
    - Apscaviroid curvifoliumcitri (former name Citrus bent leaf viroid); (CBLVd); accession M74065, genome length 318nt
    - Apscaviroid pustulapyri (former name Pear blister canker viroid); (PBCVd); accession D12823, genome length 315nt
    - Apscaviroid austravitis (former name Australian grapevine viroid); (AGVd); accession X17101, genome length 369nt
    - Apscaviroid maculamali (former name Apscaviroid aclsvd)
    - Apscaviroid etacitri (former name Apscaviroid cvd-VII)
    - Apscaviroid dendrobii (former name Apscaviroid dvd)
    - Apscaviroid latensvitis (former name Apscaviroid glvd)
    - Apscaviroid litchis (former name Apscaviroid lvd)
    - Apscaviroid latenspruni (former name Apscaviroid plvd-I)
    - Apscaviroid diospyri (former name Apscaviroid pvd)
    - Apscaviroid betadiospyri (former name Apscaviroid pvd-2)
    - Apscaviroid nanocitri (former name Citrus dwarfing viroid)
    - Apscaviroid epsiloncitri (former name Citrus viroid V)
    - Apscaviroid zetacitri (former name Citrus viroid VI)
    - Apscaviroid japanvitis
  - Genus Coleviroid; type species: Coleviroid alphacolei (former name Coleus blumei viroid 1); (CbVd-1); 248–251 nt
    - Coleviroid betacolei (former name Coleus blumei viroid 2); (CbVd-2); accession X95365, genome length 301nt
    - Coleviroid gammacolei (former name Coleus blumei viroid 3); (CbVd-3); accession X95364, genome length 361nt
    - Coleviroid epsiloncolei (former name Coleviroid cbvd-5)
    - Coleviroid zetacolei (former name Coleviroid cbvd-6)
- Family Avsunviroidae: autocatalytic clevage
  - Genus Avsunviroid; type species: Avsunviroid albamaculaperseae (former name Avocado sunblotch viroid); 246–251 nt
  - Genus Pelamoviroid; type species: Pelamoviroid latenspruni (former name Peach latent mosaic viroid); 335–351 nt
    - Pelamoviroid maculachrysanthemi (former name Chrysanthemum chlorotic mottle viroid)
    - Pelamoviroid malleusmali (former name Apple hammerhead viroid)
  - Genus Elaviroid; type species: Elaviroid latensmelongenae (former name Eggplant latent viroid); 332–335 nt

== Transmission and replication ==
The reproduction mechanism of a typical viroid. Leaf contact transmits the viroid. The viroid enters the cell via its plasmodesmata. RNA polymerase II catalyzes rolling-circle synthesis of new viroids.

Viroids are only known to infect plants, and infectious viroids can be transmitted to new plant hosts by aphids, by cross contamination following mechanical damage to plants as a result of horticultural or agricultural practices, or from plant to plant by leaf contact. Upon infection, viroids replicate in the nucleus (Pospiviroidae) or chloroplasts (Avsunviroidae) of plant cells in three steps through an RNA-based mechanism. They require RNA polymerase II, a host cell enzyme normally associated with synthesis of messenger RNA from DNA, which instead catalyzes "rolling circle" synthesis of new RNA using the viroid as template.

Unlike plant viruses which produce movement proteins, viroids are entirely passive, relying entirely on the host. This is useful in the study of RNA kinetics in plants.

== RNA silencing ==
There has long been uncertainty over how viroids induce symptoms in plants without encoding any protein products within their sequences. Evidence suggests that RNA silencing is involved in the process. First, changes to the viroid genome can dramatically alter its virulence. This reflects the fact that any siRNAs produced would have less complementary base pairing with target messenger RNA. Secondly, siRNAs corresponding to sequences from viroid genomes have been isolated from infected plants. Finally, transgenic expression of the noninfectious hpRNA of potato spindle tuber viroid develops all the corresponding viroid-like symptoms. This indicates that when viroids replicate via a double stranded intermediate RNA, they are targeted by a dicer enzyme and cleaved into siRNAs that are then loaded onto the RNA-induced silencing complex. The viroid siRNAs contain sequences capable of complementary base pairing with the plant's own messenger RNAs, and induction of degradation or inhibition of translation causes the classic viroid symptoms.

== Viroid-like elements ==
Viroid-like elements are pieces of covalently closed circular (ccc) RNA molecules that do not share the viroid's lifecycle. The category encompasses satellite RNAs (including small plant satRNAs "virusoids", fungal "ambivirus", and the much larger HDV-like Ribozyviria) and "retroviroids". Most of them also carry some type of a ribozyme.

=== Viroid-like satellite RNAs ===
Viroid-like satellite RNAs are infectious circular RNA molecules that depend on a carrier virus to reproduce, being carried in their capsids. Like Avsunviroidae, however, they are capable of self-clevage.

=== Ambiviruses ===
In the 2020s, mobile genetic elements called ambiviruses were discovered in fungi. Their RNA genomes are circular, circa 5 kb in length. One of at least two open reading frames encodes a viral RNA-directed RNA polymerase, that firmly places "ambiviruses" into ribovirian kingdom Orthornavirae; a separate phylum Ambiviricota has been established since the 2023 ICTV Virus Taxonomy Release because of the unique features of encoding RNA-directed RNA polymerases but also having divergent ribozymes in various combinations in both sense and antisense orientation – the detection of circular forms in both sense orientations suggest that "ambiviruses" use rolling circle replication for propagation.

=== Retroviroids ===
"Retroviroids", more formally "retroviroid-like elements", are viroid-like circular RNA sequences that are also found with homologous copies in the DNA genome of the host. The only types found are closely related to the original "carnation small viroid-like RNA" (CarSV). These elements may act as a homologous substrate upon which recombination may occur and are linked to double-stranded break repair.

These elements are dubbed retroviroids as the homologous DNA is generated by reverse transcriptase that is encoded by retroviruses. They are neither true viroids nor viroid-like satellite RNAs: there is no extracellular form of these elements; instead, they are spread only through pollen or egg-cells. They appear to co-occur with a pararetrovirus.

=== Obelisks ===
After applying metatranscriptomics – the computer-aided search for RNA sequences and their analysis – biologists reported in January 2024 the discovery of "obelisks", a new class of viroid-like elements, and "oblins", their related group of proteins, in the human microbiome. Given that the RNA sequences recovered do not have homologies in any other known life form, the researchers suggest that the obelisks are distinct from viruses, viroids and viroid-like entities, and thus form an entirely new class of organisms.

== RNA world hypothesis ==
Diener's 1989 hypothesis had proposed that the unique properties of viroids make them more plausible macromolecules than introns, or other RNAs considered in the past as possible "living relics" of a hypothetical, pre-cellular RNA world. If so, viroids have assumed significance beyond plant virology for evolutionary theory, because their properties make them more plausible candidates than other RNAs to perform crucial steps in the evolution of life from inanimate matter (abiogenesis). Diener's hypothesis was mostly forgotten until 2014, when it was resurrected in a review article by Flores et al., in which the authors summarized Diener's evidence supporting his hypothesis as:

1. Viroids' small size, imposed by error-prone replication.
2. Their high guanine and cytosine content, which increases stability and replication fidelity.
3. Their circular structure, which assures complete replication without genomic tags.
4. Existence of structural periodicity, which permits modular assembly into enlarged genomes.
5. Their lack of protein-coding ability, consistent with a ribosome-free habitat.
6. Replication mediated in some by ribozymes—the fingerprint of the RNA world.

The presence, in extant cells, of RNAs with molecular properties predicted for RNAs of the RNA world constitutes another powerful argument supporting the RNA world hypothesis. However, the origins of viroids themselves from this RNA world has been cast into doubt by several factors, including the discovery of retrozymes (a family of retrotransposon likely representing their ancestors) and their complete absence from organisms outside of the plants (especially their complete absence from prokaryotes including bacteria and archaea). However, recent studies suggest that the diversity of viroids and others viroid-like elements is broader than previously thought and that it would not be limited to plants, encompassing even the prokaryotes. Matches between viroid cccRNAs and CRISPR spacers suggested that some of them might replicate in prokaryotes, whereas the discovery of "obelisks" in bacteria strongly supports the original idea of extant viroid-like RNAs as "living relics" of the RNA world.

== Control ==
The development of tests based on ELISA, PCR, and nucleic acid hybridization has allowed for rapid and inexpensive detection of known viroids in biosecurity inspections, phytosanitary inspections, and quarantine.

== History ==
In the 1920s, symptoms of a previously unknown potato disease were noticed in New York and New Jersey fields. Because tubers on affected plants become elongated and misshapen, they named it the potato spindle tuber disease.

The symptoms appeared on plants onto which pieces from affected plants had been budded—indicating that the disease was caused by a transmissible pathogenic agent. A fungus or bacterium could not be found consistently associated with symptom-bearing plants, however, and therefore, it was assumed the disease was caused by a virus. Despite numerous attempts over the years to isolate and purify the assumed virus, using increasingly sophisticated methods, these were unsuccessful when applied to extracts from potato spindle tuber disease-afflicted plants.

In 1971, Theodor O. Diener showed that the agent was not a virus, but a totally unexpected novel type of pathogen, 1/80th the size of typical viruses, for which he proposed the term "viroid". Parallel to agriculture-directed studies, more basic scientific research elucidated many of viroids' physical, chemical, and macromolecular properties. Viroids were shown to consist of short stretches (a few hundred nucleotides) of single-stranded RNA and, unlike viruses, did not have a protein coat. Viroids are extremely small, from 246 to 467 nucleotides, smaller than other infectious plant pathogens; they thus consist of fewer than 10,000 atoms. In comparison, the genomes of the smallest known viruses capable of causing an infection by themselves are around 2,000 nucleotides long.

In 1976, Sanger et al. presented evidence that potato spindle tuber viroid is a "single-stranded, covalently closed, circular RNA molecule, existing as a highly base-paired rod-like structure"—believed to be the first such molecule described. Circular RNA, unlike linear RNA, forms a covalently closed continuous loop, in which the 3' and 5' ends present in linear RNA molecules have been joined. Sanger et al. also provided evidence for the true circularity of viroids by finding that the RNA could not be phosphorylated at the 5' terminus. In other tests, they failed to find even one free 3' end, which ruled out the possibility of the molecule having two 3' ends. Viroids thus are true circular RNAs.

The single-strandedness and circularity of viroids was confirmed by electron microscopy, The complete nucleotide sequence of potato spindle tuber viroid was determined in 1978. PSTVd was the first pathogen of a eukaryotic organism for which the complete molecular structure has been established. Over thirty plant diseases have since been identified as viroid-, not virus-caused, as had been assumed.

Four additional viroids or viroid-like RNA particles were discovered between 2009 and 2015.

In 2014, New York Times science writer Carl Zimmer published a popularized piece that mistakenly credited Flores et al. with the virioid - RNA world hypothesis' original conception.

In January 2024, biologists reported the discovery of "obelisks", a new class of viroid-like elements, and "oblins", their related group of proteins, in the human microbiome.

== See also ==
- Circular RNA
- Microparasite
- Non-cellular life
- Obelisk
- Plant pathology
- Plasmid
- Prion
- RNA world hypothesis
- Satellite
- Virus
- Virus classification
- Virusoid
- Retrozyme
- Transposable element
- Subviral agent
- List of subviral agents
