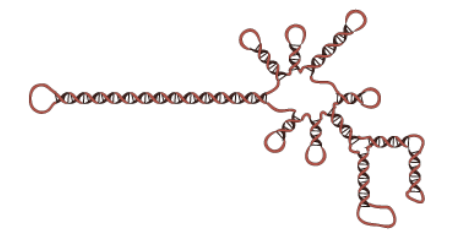
- Viroid of family Avsunviroidae

Virus classification
- Informal group: Subviral agents
- Informal group: Viroids
- Family: Avsunviroidae

Genera
- Avsunviroid; Elaviroid; Pelamoviroid

= Avsunviroidae =

Family of viroids

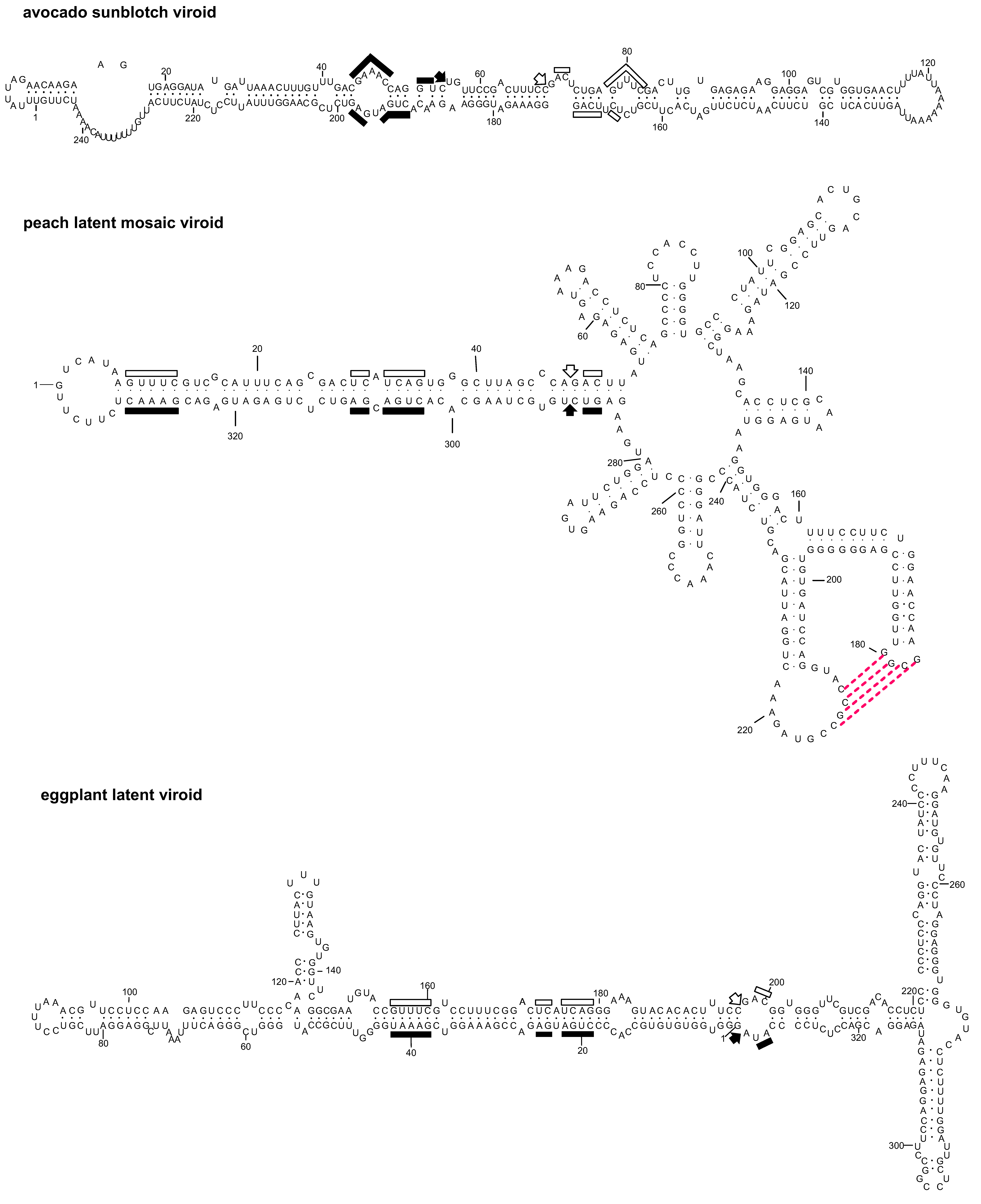
Secondary structure proposed for representative members of the family Avsunviroidae

The Avsunviroidae are a family of viroids. There are five species in three genera (Avsunviroid, Elaviroid and Pelamoviroid). They consist of RNA genomes between 246 and 375 nucleotides in length. They are single-stranded covalent circles and have intramolecular base pairing. All members lack a central conserved region.

== Replication ==
Replication occurs in the chloroplasts of plant cells. Key features of replication include no helper virus required and no proteins are encoded for. Unlike the other family of viroids, Pospiviroidae, Avsunviroidae are thought to replicate via a symmetric rolling circle mechanism. Replication is catalysed by a host nuclear-encoded RNA polymerase, which normally is DNA-dependent. The circular positive-sense RNA genome serves as template for the enzyme to form negative-sense RNA concatemers. The concatemers then self-cleave via hammerhead ribozyme activity into negative-sense RNA monomers with 5'-hydroxyl and 2',3'-cyclic phosphate termini. A host tRNA ligase circularises these monomers. The same steps are repeated with the resulting circular negative-sense RNA (which is why the mode of replication is called "symmetric"), yielding the circular positive-sense RNA genome. The site of replication is unknown but it is thought to be in the chloroplast and in the presence of Mg^{2+} ions.

== Structure ==
Predictions of structure have suggested that they exist either as rod-shaped molecules with regions of base pairing causing formation of some hairpin loops or have branched configurations.

The family has four stretches of conserved nucleotides, guuuc, uc, ucag, ac from 5' to 3', plus their Watson-Crick pairings on the other end of the loop. This is part of its hammerhead ribozyme. Otherwise there is little structural similarity in the family. (Note: p. 120, "Apart from the core nucleotides conserved in their hammerhead structures, no extensive sequence similarities exist between them") They do not have the conserved CCH, TCR, or TCH motifs, which is one of the features defining their separation from the Pospiviroidae. (Note: p. 118-120, "The other four viroids, Avocado sunblotch viroid (ASBVd) (47), Peach latent mosaic viroid (PLMVd) (45), Chrysanthemum chlorotic mottle viroid (CChMVd) (65), and Eggplant latent viroid (ELVd) (30), do not have the conserved CCR, TCR, and TCH motifs but, remarkably, both their polarity strands self-cleave through hammerhead ribozymes; they form the second family, Avsunviroidae (reviewed in 33), whose type species is ASBVd (formal inclusion of ELVd in this family is pending ICTV approval) (Figure 1b).")

== Classification ==
The family has three genera, with a total of five species.

- Family Avsunviroidae
  - Genus Avsunviroid; (Note: p. 120, "ASBVd, the only viroid with a high A + U content (62%) (47), forms a monospecific genus")
    - Species: Avocado sunblotch viroid (ASBVd, acc. J02020, gen. len. 247nt) (Note: p. 119, TABLE 1)
  - Genus Elaviroid; (Note: p. 120, "and ELVd, whose properties fall between those of the members of the other two genera, has been proposed to constitute its own genus (30).)
    - Species: Eggplant latent viroid (ELVd, acc. AJ536613, gen. len. 333nt)
  - Genus Pelamoviroid; (Note: p. 120, "but PLMVd and CChMVd are grouped in one genus because of their branched secondary structure (21, 45, 65), which is stabilized by a pseudoknot (10; S. Gago, M. De la Peňa & R. Flores, unpublished results) (Figure 1b), and their insolubility in2M LiCl (65).")
    - Species: Appler hammerhead viroid, Chrysanthemum chlorotic mottle viroid (CChMVd, acc. Y14700, gen. len. 399nt) and Peach latent mosaic viroid (PLMVd, acc. M83545, gen. len. 337nt)

== Detection ==
The lack of a long, central conserved region makes Avsunviroidae harder to identify than Pospiviroidae. A method to detect them is to use their circularity: a computer can piece together many overlapping reads that appear to form repeats when placed linearly.
