= Apscaviroid =

Virus classification
- Informal group: Subviral agents
- Informal group: Viroids
- Family: Pospiviroidae
- Genus: Apscaviroid

Species
- Apple dimple fruit viroid; Apple scar skin viroid; Apscaviroid aclsvd; Apscaviroid cvd-VII; Apscaviroid dvd; Apscaviroid glvd; Apscaviroid lvd; Apscaviroid plvd-I; Apscaviroid pvd; Apscaviroid pvd-2; Australian grapevine viroid; Citrus bent leaf viroid; Citrus dwarfing viroid; Citrus viroid V; Citrus viroid VI; Grapevine yellow speckle viroid 1; Grapevine yellow speckle viroid 2; Pear blister canker viroid

Genus of viroids

Apscaviroid is a genus of ssRNA viroids that belongs to the family Pospiviroidae.

== Taxonomy ==
Name	Abbr	GenBank	REFSEQ
Apple dimple fruit viroid	ADFVd	X99487	NC_003463
Apple scar skin viroid	ASSVd	X17696	NC_001340
Apscaviroid aclsvd	ACFSVd	MF521431	N/A
Apscaviroid cvd-VII	CVd-VII	KX013549	N/A
Apscaviroid dvd	DVd	MT013216	N/A
Apscaviroid glvd	GLVd	KR605505	NC_028131
Apscaviroid lvd	LVd	MF156698	NC_035620
Apscaviroid plvd-I	PlVd-I	MN734702	N/A
Apscaviroid pvd	PVd	AB366022	NC_010308
Apscaviroid pvd-2	PVd-2	AB817729	NC_021720
Australian grapevine viroid	AGVd	X17101	NC_003553
Citrus bent leaf viroid	CBLVd	U21125	NC_001651
Citrus dwarfing viroid	CDVd	AF447788	NC_003264
Citrus viroid V	CVdV	EF617306	NC_010165
Citrus viroid VI	CVdVI	AB019508	NC_004359
Grapevine yellow speckle viroid 1	GYSVd1	AF059712	NC_001920
Grapevine yellow speckle viroid 2	GYSVd2	J04348	NC_003612
Pear blister canker viroid	PBCVd	D12823	NC_001830
