= Hop stunt viroid =

Virus classification
- Informal group: Subviral agents
- Informal group: Viroids
- Family: Pospiviroidae
- Genus: Hostuviroid
- Species: Hop stunt viroid

Species of viroid

The hop stunt viroid (abbreviated HSVd, binomial name Hostuviroid impedihumuli) is a viroid species that infects the common hop plant, citrus plants, grapevines, cucumber, and several Prunus species such as almond, apricot, plum, and peach. It is asymptomatic or latent in most host plants, but in some hosts it can cause stunting and other symptoms. A study of HSVd-infected hops in the USA showed that the severity of yield reduction was highly dependent on the infected hop cultivar.

HSVd is a member of the Pospiviroidae family and the Hostuviroid genus. There are various different sub-species of the hop stunt viroid.

== Genome ==
The hop stunt viroid has a single-stranded RNA genome; the genome is 297 nucleotides long.

== Strains ==
All strains are from NCBI.

- Citrus gummy bark viroid
- Dapple peach fruit disease viroid
- Dapple plum and peach fruit disease viroid
- Grapevine viroid
- Hop stunt viroid - citrus
- Hop stunt viroid - cucumber
