= Potato spindle tuber viroid =

Virus classification
- Informal group: Subviral agents
- Informal group: Viroids
- Family: Pospiviroidae
- Genus: Pospiviroid
- Species: Potato spindle tuber viroid

Strains
- PSTVd:avocado; PSTVd:pepino; PSTVd:Solanum

Species of viroid

The potato spindle tuber viroid (PSTVd, Pospiviroid fusituberis) was the first viroid to be identified. PSTVd is a small, single stranded circular RNA molecule closely related to the chrysanthemum stunt viroid. Present within the viroidal RNA is the Pospiviroid RY motif stem loop common to its genus. The natural hosts are potatoes (Solanum tuberosum) and tomatoes (Solanum lycopersicum). All potatoes and tomatoes are susceptible to PSTVd and there is no form of natural resistance. Natural infections have also been seen in avocados and infections in other solanaceous crops have been induced in the laboratory. Until 2017 PSTVd was thought to be unable to infect Solanum sisymbriifolium. Then in May seeds exported by a Dutch company were noticed to be infected. These seeds were shipped from the company, but had been originally bred to their specifications in two Asian countries. PSTVd also causes tomato bunchy top and is seed transmitted in tomato. It contains single stranded RNA without protein coat.

== Discovery ==
It was discovered in 1971 by Theodor Otto Diener, who was a plant pathologist at the U.S Department of Agriculture's Research Center in Beltsville, Maryland. He named it viroid because it is 1/80th the size of a virus.

== Strains and their symptoms ==
Different strains of PSTVd exist and symptoms range from mild to severe. Mild strains produce no obvious symptoms. Symptoms in severe strains are dependent on environmental conditions and are most severe in hot conditions. Symptoms may be mild in initial infections but become progressively worse in the following generations. Common symptoms of severe infections include color changes in the foliage, smaller leaves and spindle-like elongation. Sprouting also occurs at a slower rate than in unaffected potatoes. Infected tomatoes are slower to show symptoms which include stunted growth with a ‘bunchy top’ caused by shortened inter-nodes. Leaves become yellow or purple and often become curled and twisted. Necrosis eventually occurs in the veins of the bottom and middle leaves and the top leaves decrease in size. Fruit ripening is also affected leading to hard, small, dark green tomatoes.

Long distance spread of PSTVd usually occurs via infected seeds but transmission via aphids (Myzus persicae) also occurs but only in the presence of PLRV (potato leaf roll virus). Mechanical transmission also occurs once it has been introduced to an area.

== Primary and secondary structure of PSTVd ==
PSTVd comprises 359 nucleotides. Used is the type genome V01465.

Primary Structure

  1   CGGAACUAAA CUCGUGGUUC CUGUGGUUCA CACCUGACCU CCUGAGCAGA AAAGAAAAAA
 61   GAAGGCGGCU CGGAGGAGCG CUUCAGGGAU CCCCGGGGAA ACCUGGAGCG AACUGGCAAA
121   AAAGGACGGU GGGGAGUGCC CAGCGGCCGA CAGGAGUAAU UCCCGCCGAA ACAGGGUUUU
181   CACCCUUCCU UUCUUCGGGU GUCCUUCCUC GCGCCCGCAG GACCACCCCU CGCCCCCUUU
241   GCGCUGUCGC UUCGGCUACU ACCCGGUGGA AACAACUGAA GCUCCCGAGA ACCGCUUUUU
301   CUCUAUCUUA CUUGCUUCGG GGCGAGGGUG UUUAGCCCUU GGAACCGCAG UUGGUUCCU

Secondary Structure

Putative secondary structure of the PSTVd viroid. The highlighted nucleotides are found in most other viroids.

== Course of infection ==
Systemic movement within the infected host is through the phloem. (Note: p. 114, "Long-Distance Trafficking In the first experimental investigation on viroid systemic movement within an infected plant, Palukaitis (99) showed that PSTVd moved from a photoassimilate-source leaf into sink organs in a pattern consistent with phloem transport. This was supported by in situ localization of PSTVd in the phloem (144).")

== Bibliography ==
- Agrios, George N., 1936- Plant pathology (3rd edition) San Diego: Academic Press, 1988.
- Singh, R.P; Fletcher J.D.; "Background of disease (potato spindle tuber) and method of control", Agriculture and Agri food Canada, Crop & Food Research New Zealand Retrieved November 15, 2007
- DEFRA Plant Health
- "Pathogen and plant damage (potato spindle tuber)" Retrieved November 15, 2007, from George N. Agrois, Plant Pathology (3rd Ed) San Diego: Academic Press,(1988).
