= Hostuviroid =

Virus classification
- (unranked): Viroid
- Family: Pospiviroidae
- Genus: Hostuviroid

Species
- Dahlia latent viroid; Hop stunt viroid

Genus of viruses

Hostuviroid is a genus of ssRNA viroids that includes Hop stunt viroid, a species of viroids that infects many different types of plants, including the common hop plant. It belongs to the family Pospiviroidae.

== Taxonomy ==
Name	Abbr	GenBank	REFSEQ
Dahlia latent viroid	DLVd	JX263426	NC_020160
Hop stunt viroid	HSVd	X06719	NC_001351
