= Pospiviroidae =

Virus classification
- Informal group: Subviral agents
- Informal group: Viroids
- Family: Pospiviroidae

Genera
- Apscaviroid; Cocadviroid; Coleviroid; Hostuviroid; Pospiviroid

Family of viroids

Pospiviroidae is an incertae sedis family of ssRNA viroids with 5 genera and 39 species, including the first viroid to be discovered, PSTVd, which is part of genus Pospiviroid. Their secondary structure is key to their biological activity. The classification of this family is based on differences in the conserved central region sequence. Pospiviroidae replication occurs in an asymmetric fashion via host cell RNA polymerase, RNase, and RNA ligase. Its hosts are plants, specifically dicotyledons and some monocotyledons. The severity of the infection can vary from no effect to devastating and widespread damage to a population. This can also depend on the virus-host combination.

== Genome ==
Members of the family Pospiviroidae have circular ssRNA of 246–375 nt. They assume rod-like or quasi-rod-like conformations containing a central conserved region (CCR) and a terminal conserved hairpin (TCH) or a terminal conserved region (TCR). The genome of viroids does not encode any proteins.

== Replication ==
Replication occurs in the nucleus and is mediated by the host enzyme DNA-dependent RNA polymerase II, which performs rolling circle replication using RNA templates. Positive-sense circular RNA molecules are transcribed into complementary negative-sense RNA strands containing multiple connected copies (a concatemer) of the genome. These negative-sense strands are used as templates to create concatemers of positive-sense strands that are cleaved into individual strands by a host RNAse III enzyme. The ends of the resulting linear molecules are connected by the host DNA ligase 1 enzyme to create genomic circular RNA.

== Taxonomy ==
Apscaviroid

- Apple dimple fruit viroid
- Apple scar skin viroid
- Apscaviroid aclsvd
- Apscaviroid cvd-VII
- Apscaviroid dvd
- Apscaviroid glvd
- Apscaviroid lvd
- Apscaviroid plvd-I
- Apscaviroid pvd
- Apscaviroid pvd-2
- Australian grapevine viroid
- Citrus bent leaf viroid
- Citrus dwarfing viroid
- Citrus viroid V
- Citrus viroid VI
- Grapevine yellow speckle viroid 1
- Grapevine yellow speckle viroid 2
- Pear blister canker viroid

Cocadviroid

- Citrus bark cracking viroid
- Coconut cadang-cadang viroid
- Coconut tinangaja viroid
- Hop latent viroid

Coleviroid

- Coleus blumei viroid 1
- Coleus blumei viroid 2
- Coleus blumei viroid 3
- Coleviroid cbvd-5
- Coleviroid cbvd-6

Hostuviroid

- Dahlia latent viroid
- Hop stunt viroid

Pospiviroid

- Chrysanthemum stunt viroid
- Citrus exocortis viroid
- Columnea latent viroid
- Iresine viroid 1
- Pepper chat fruit viroid
- Pospiviroid plvd
- Potato spindle tuber viroid
- Tomato apical stunt viroid
- Tomato chlorotic dwarf viroid
- Tomato planta macho viroid
