= Hydrophile =

Molecular entity that is attracted to water

Schedorhinotermes termites use hydrophilic surfaces on body and wings to attach themselves to plants they colonize.

A hydrophile is a molecule or other molecular entity that is attracted to water molecules and tends to be dissolved by water.

In contrast, hydrophobes are not attracted to water and may seem to be repelled by it. Hygroscopics are attracted to water, but are not dissolved by water.

== Molecules ==
A hydrophilic molecule or portion of a molecule is one whose interactions with water and other polar substances are more thermodynamically favorable than their interactions with oil or other hydrophobic solvents. They are typically charge-polarized and capable of hydrogen bonding. This makes these molecules soluble not only in water but also in polar solvents.

Hydrophilic molecules (and portions of molecules) can be contrasted with hydrophobic molecules (and portions of molecules). In some cases, both hydrophilic and hydrophobic properties occur in a single molecule. An example of these amphiphilic molecules is the lipids that comprise the cell membrane. Another example is soap, which has a hydrophilic head and a hydrophobic tail, allowing it to dissolve in both water and oil.

Hydrophilic and hydrophobic molecules are also known as polar molecules and nonpolar molecules, respectively. Some hydrophilic substances do not dissolve. This type of mixture is called a colloid.

An approximate rule of thumb for hydrophilicity of organic compounds is that solubility of a molecule in water is more than one mass % if there is at least one neutral hydrophile group per five carbons, or at least one electrically charged hydrophile group per seven carbons.

Hydrophilic substances (ex: salts) can seem to attract water out of the air. Sugar is also hydrophilic, and like salt is sometimes used to draw water out of foods. Sugar sprinkled on cut fruit will "draw out the water" through hydrophilia, making the fruit mushy and wet, as in a common strawberry compote recipe.

== Chemicals ==
Liquid hydrophilic chemicals complexed with solid chemicals can be used to optimize solubility of hydrophobic chemicals.

=== Liquid chemicals ===
Examples of hydrophilic liquids include ammonia, alcohols, some amides such as urea and some carboxylic acids such as acetic acid.

==== Alcohols ====
Hydroxyl groups (-OH), found in alcohols, are polar and therefore hydrophilic (water liking) but their carbon chain portion is non-polar which make them hydrophobic. The molecule increasingly becomes overall more nonpolar and therefore less soluble in the polar water as the carbon chain becomes longer. Methanol has the shortest carbon chain of all alcohols (one carbon atom) followed by ethanol (two carbon atoms), and 1-propanol along with its isomer 2-propanol, all being miscible with water. Tert-Butyl alcohol, with four carbon atoms, is the only one among its isomers to be miscible with water.

=== Solid chemicals ===
==== Cyclodextrins ====
Cyclodextrins are used to make pharmaceutical solutions by capturing hydrophobic molecules as guest hosts. Because inclusion compounds of cyclodextrins with hydrophobic molecules are able to penetrate body tissues, these can be used to release biologically active compounds under specific conditions. For example, testosterone is complexed with hydroxy-propyl-beta-cyclodextrin (HPBCD), 95% absorption of testosterone was achieved in 20 minutes via the sublingual route but HPBCD was not absorbed, whereas hydrophobic testosterone is usually absorbed less than 40% via the sublingual route.

== Membrane filtration ==
Hydrophilic membrane filtration is used in several industries to filter various liquids. These hydrophilic filters are used in the medical, industrial, and biochemical fields to filter elements such as bacteria, viruses, proteins, particulates, drugs, and other contaminants. Common hydrophilic molecules include colloids, cotton, and cellulose (which cotton consists of).

Unlike other membranes, hydrophilic membranes do not require pre-wetting: they can filter liquids in their dry state. Although most are used in low-heat filtration processes, many new hydrophilic membrane fabrics are used to filter hot liquids and fluids.

== See also ==
- Hydrophilic-lipophilic balance
- Hydrophobicity scales
- Superhydrophilicity
- Ultrahydrophobicity
