= Subrealm =

Subrealm may refer to:

- Realm (virology) § Subrealm
- A cluster of bioregions, part of a biogeographic realm
