= Daletvirus =

Virus classification
- (unranked): Virus
- Realm: Ribozyviria
- Family: Kolmioviridae
- Genus: Daletvirus

Synonyms
- Swiss snake colony virus 1 (SwSCV-1); sHDV

Genus of viruses

Daletvirus is a genus of viruses in the realm Ribozyviria, containing the single species Daletvirus boae.

== Host ==
The boa constrictor (Boa constrictor) and the Savu python (Liasis mackloti savuensis) serve as its hosts.

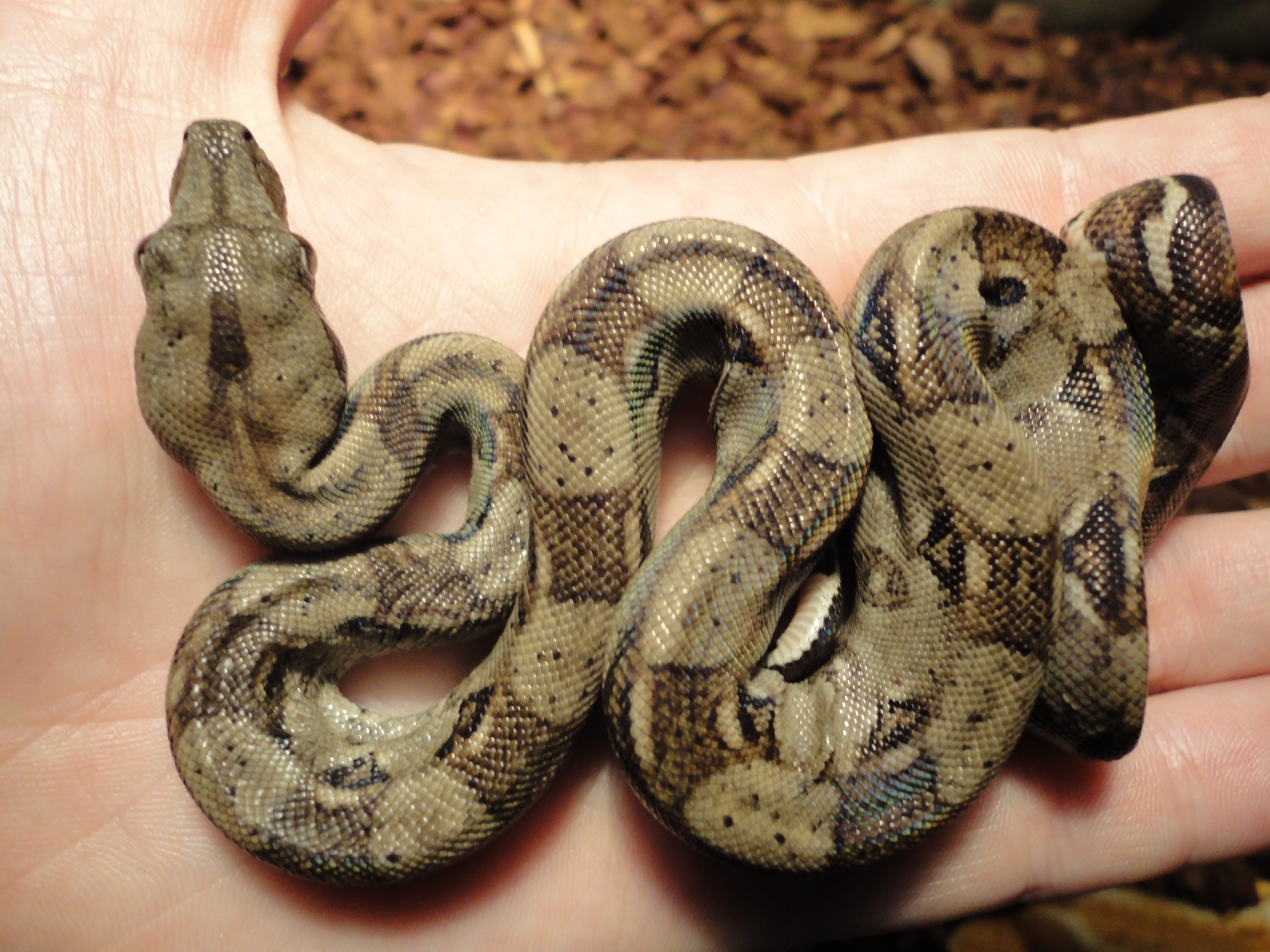
Boa constrictor (Boa constrictor)

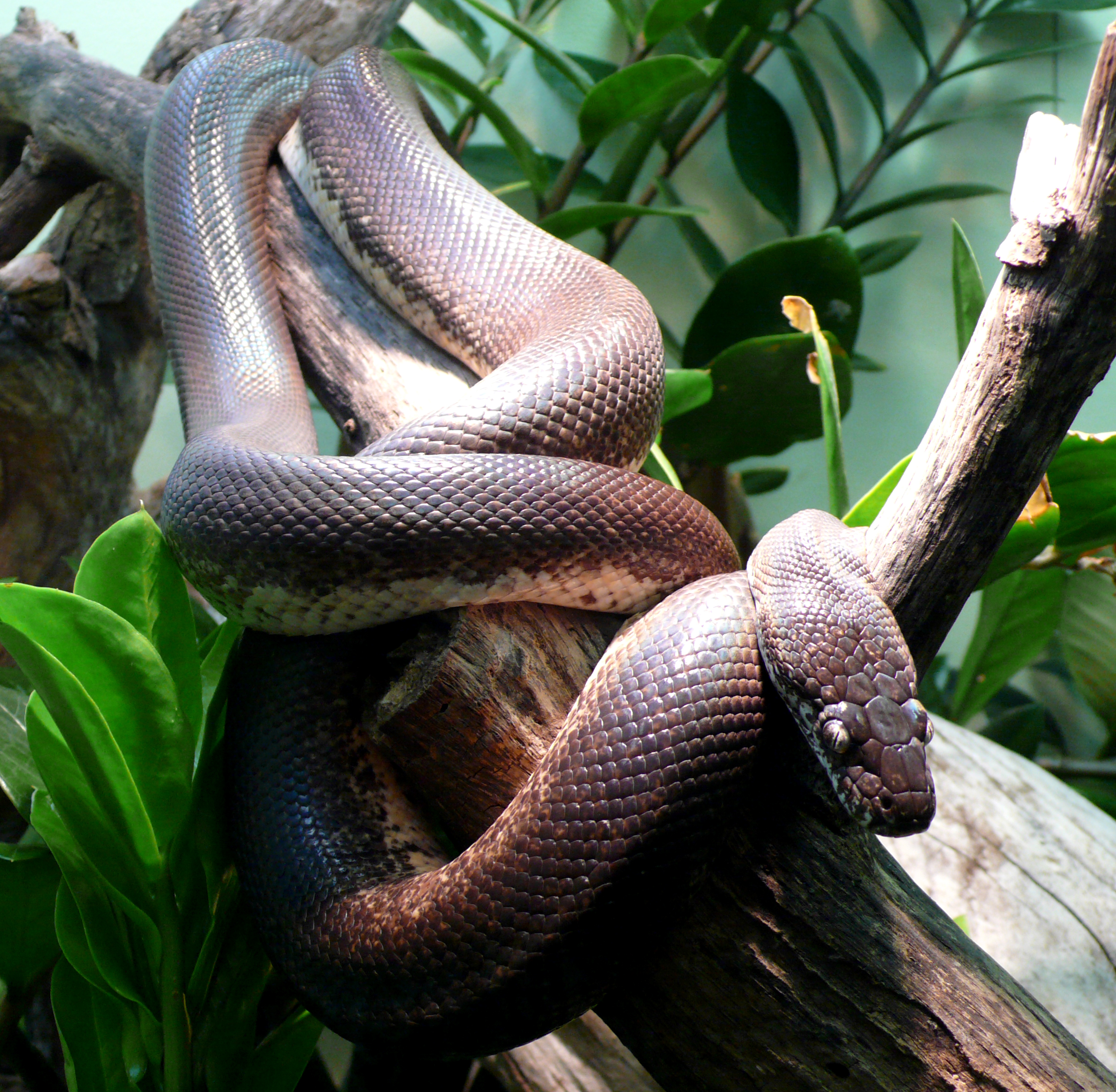
Savu python (Liasis mackloti savuensis)
