= Deevirus =

Virus classification
- (unranked): Virus
- Realm: Ribozyviria
- Family: Kolmioviridae
- Genus: Deevirus

Synonyms
- Ray-finned fish virus 1 (RFFV-1); fHDV

Genus of viruses

Deevirus is a genus of viruses in the realm Ribozyviria, containing the single species Deevirus actinopterygii. Various ray-finned fishes (Actinopterygii) serve as its hosts.
