= Dalvirus =

Virus classification
- (unranked): Virus
- Realm: Ribozyviria
- Family: Kolmioviridae
- Genus: Dalvirus

Synonyms
- Dabbling duck virus 1 (DabDV-1); avHDV

Genus of viruses

Dalvirus is a genus of viruses in the realm Ribozyviria, containing the single species Dalvirus anatis.

== Hosts ==
The grey teal (Anas gracilis), chestnut teal (A. castanea), and Pacific black duck (A. superciliosa) serve as its hosts.

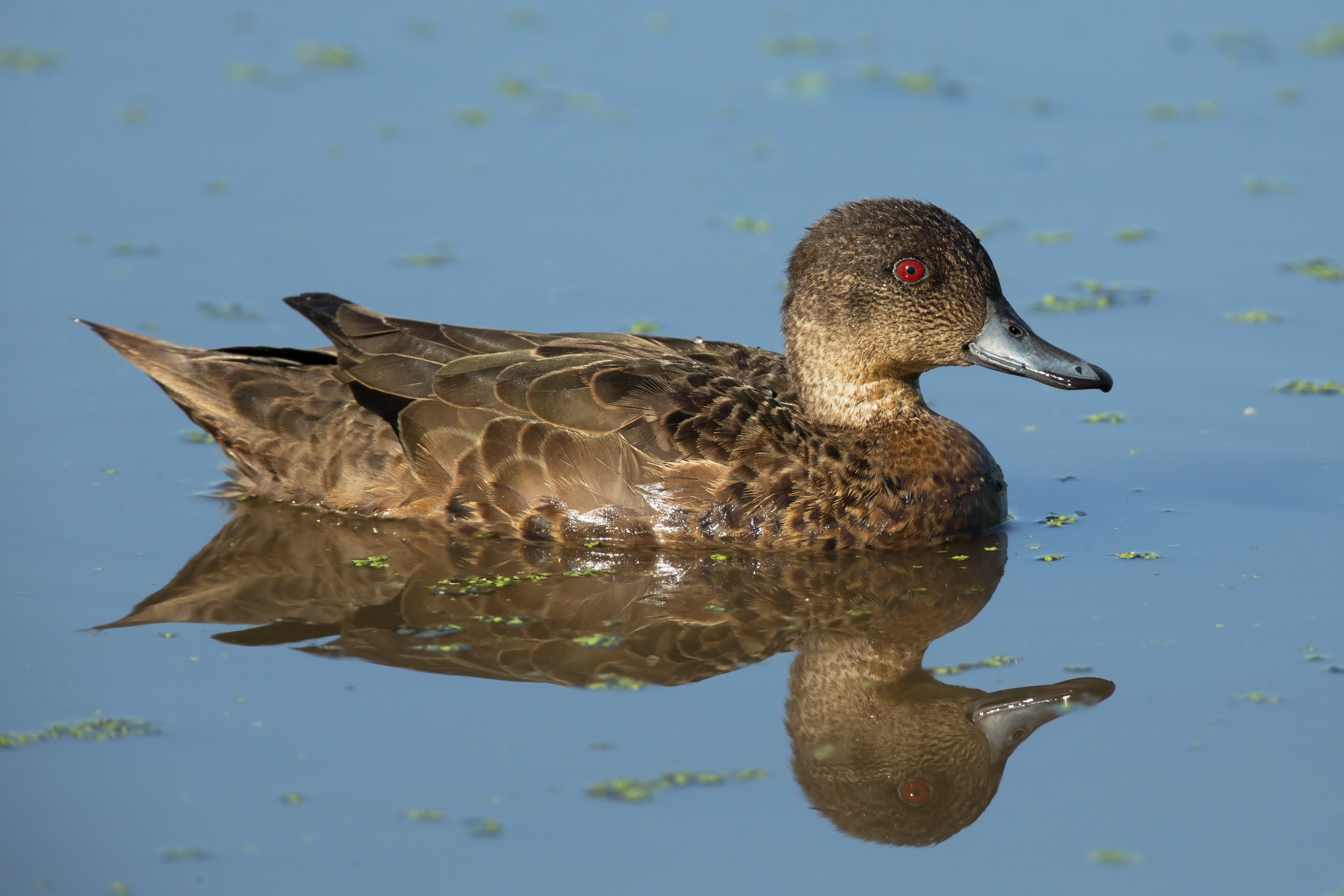
A. gracilis

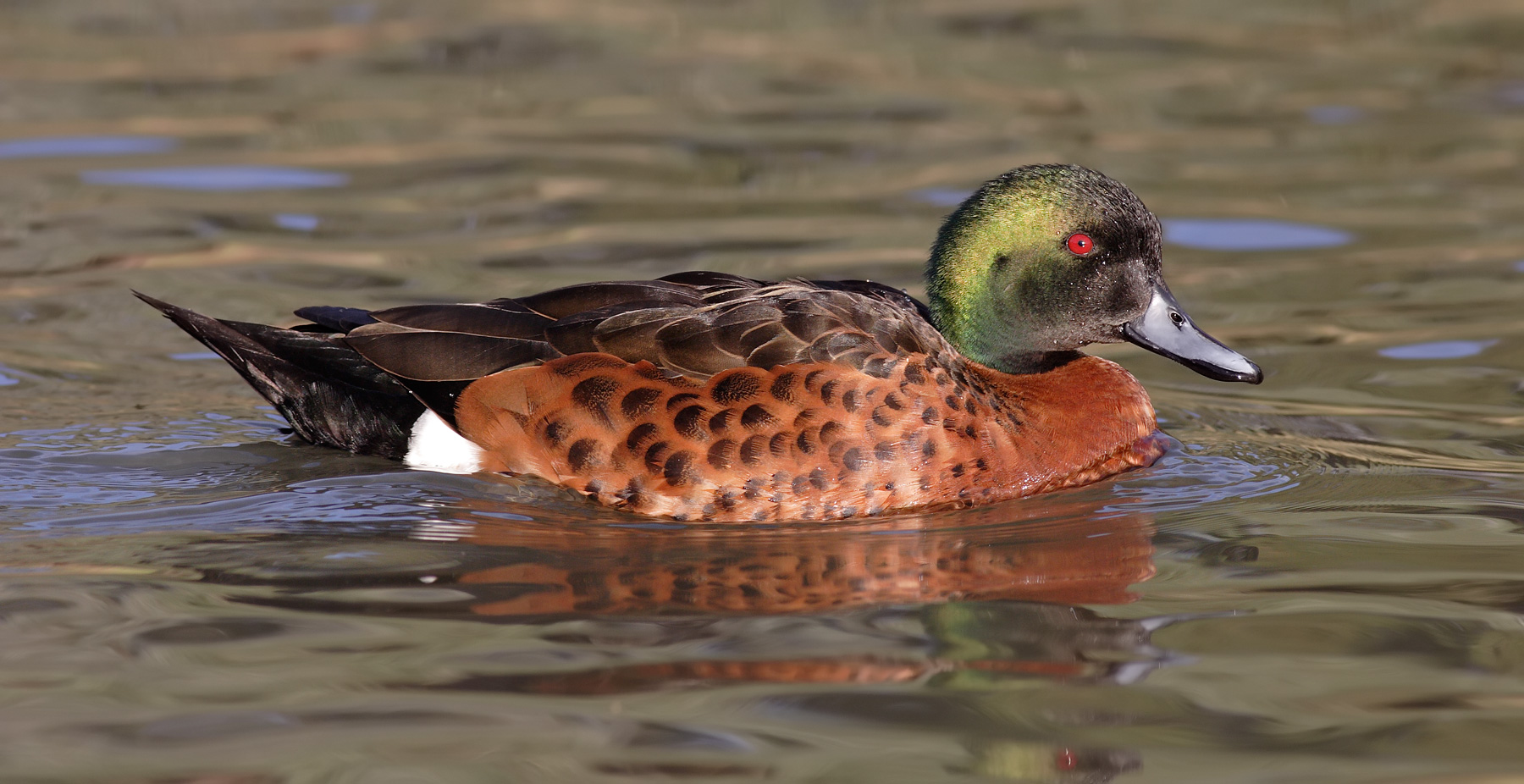
A. castanea

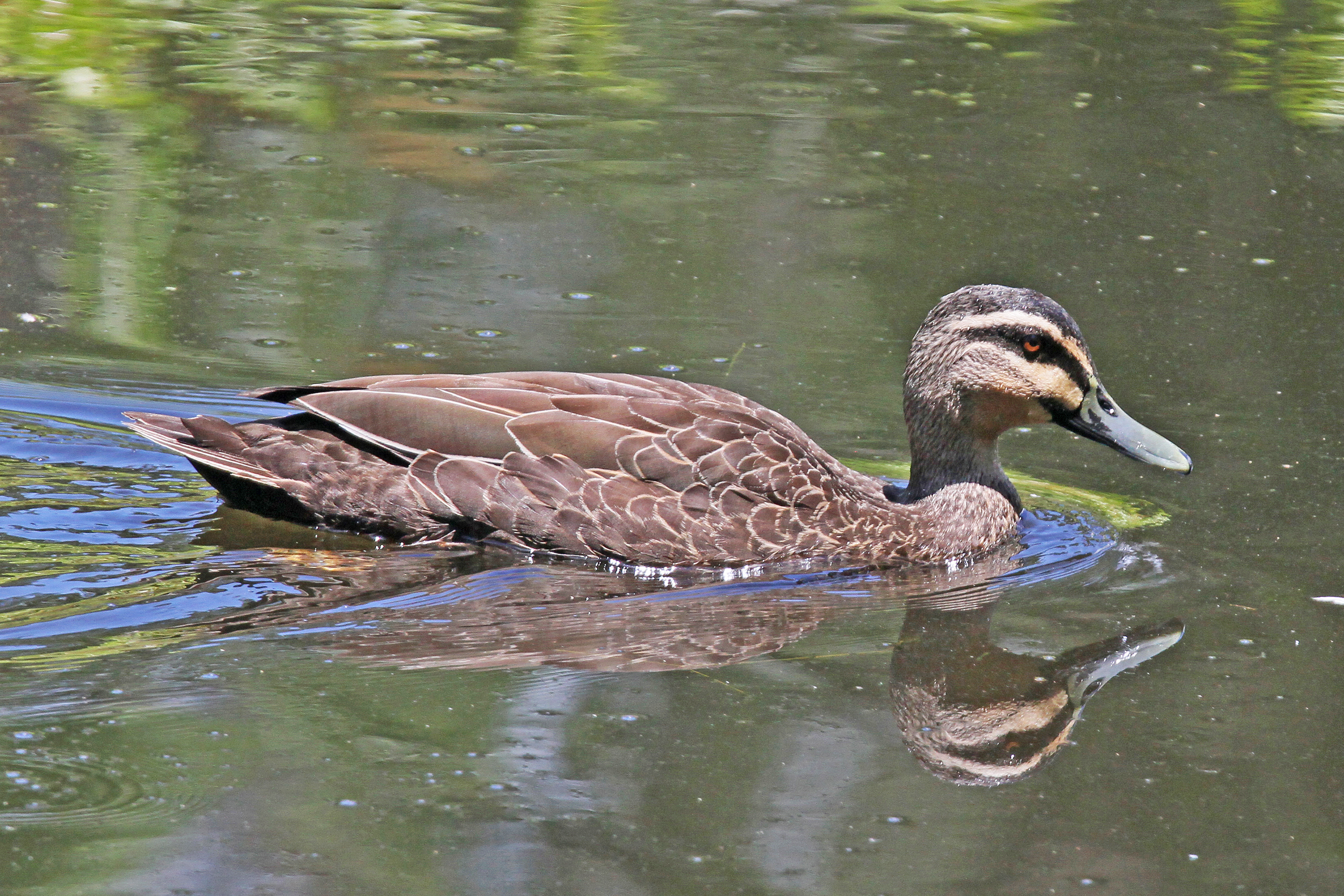
A. superciliosa
