= Dobrovirus =

Virus classification
- (unranked): Virus
- Realm: Ribozyviria
- Family: Kolmioviridae
- Genus: Dobrovirus

Synonyms
- Chusan Island toad virus 1 (CITV-1); tfHDV

Genus of viruses

Dobrovirus is a genus of viruses in the realm Ribozyviria, containing the single species Dobrovirus bufonis.

== Host ==
The Chusan Island toad (Bufo gargarizans) serves as its host.

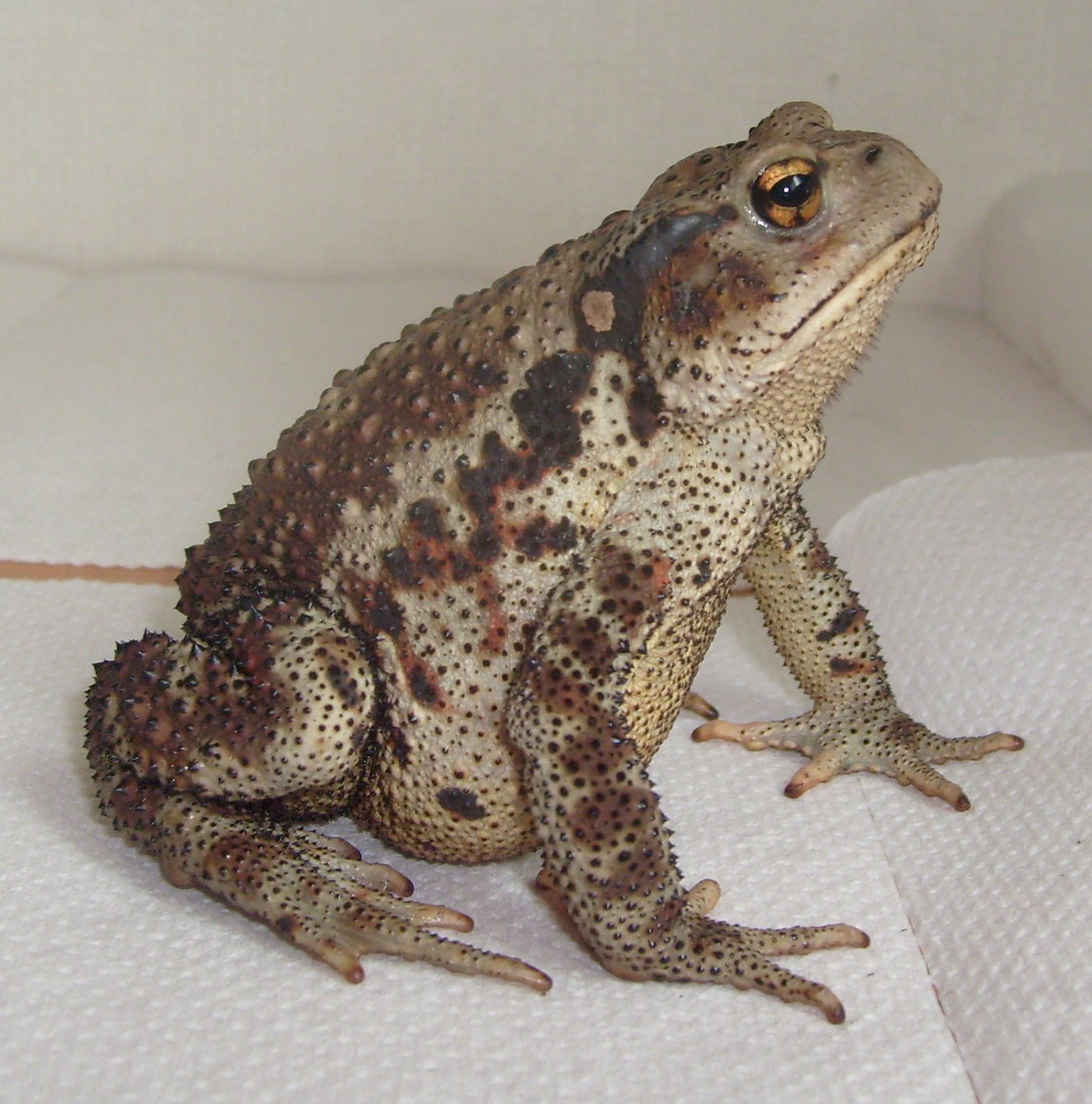
B. gargarizans
