= Daazvirus =

Virus classification
- (unranked): Virus
- Realm: Ribozyviria
- Family: Kolmioviridae
- Genus: Daazvirus

Synonyms
- Chinese fire belly newt virus 1 (CFBNV-1); amHDV

Monotypic genus of viruses

Daazvirus is a genus of viruses in the realm Ribozyviria, containing the single species Daazvirus cynopis. They are only known to infect and affect Salamandrid amphibians (Newts).

== Host ==
The Chinese fire belly newt (Cynops orientalis) serves as its host.

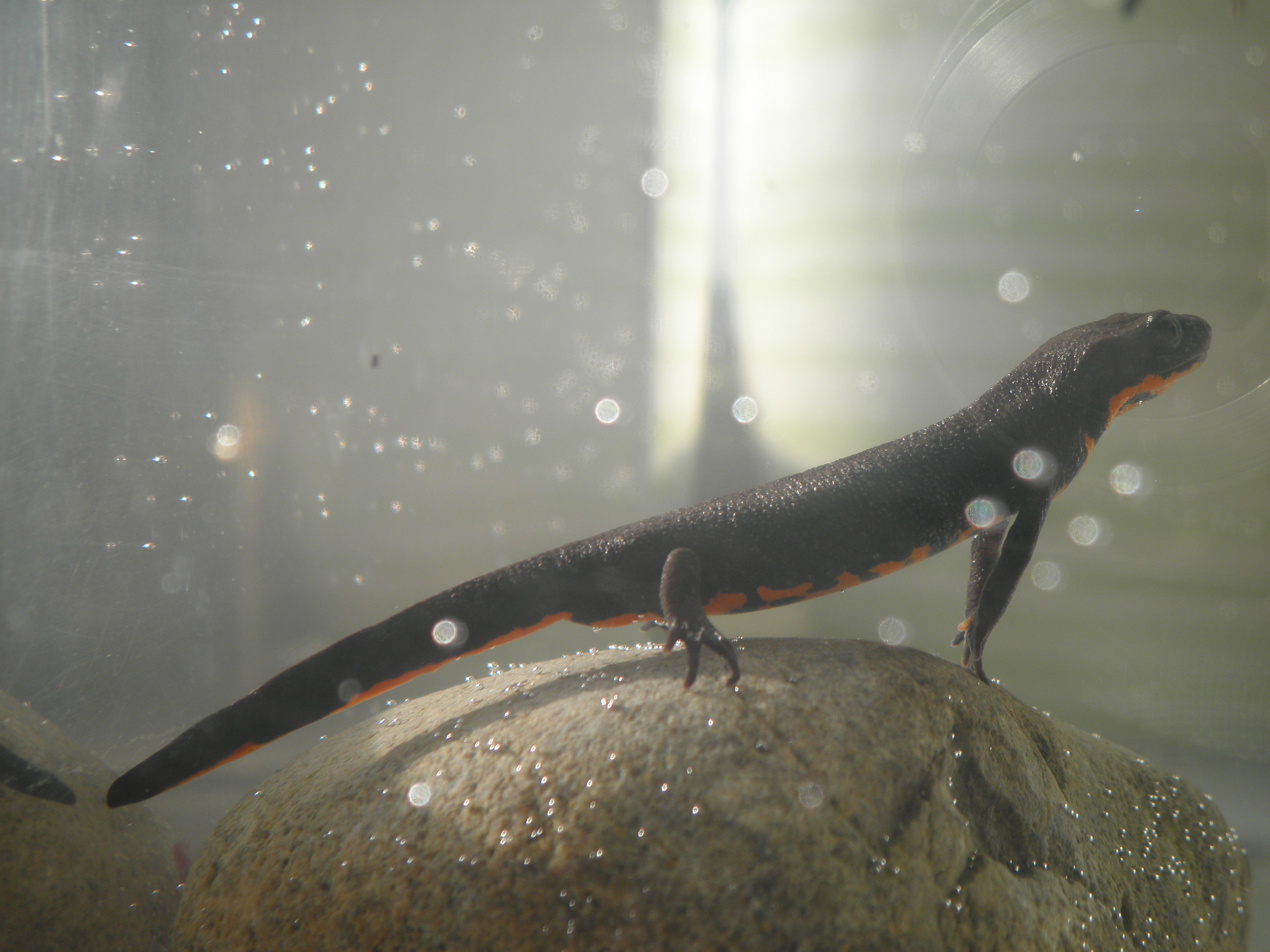
C. orientalis
