= Thurisazvirus =

Virus classification
- (unranked): Virus
- Realm: Ribozyviria
- Family: Kolmioviridae
- Genus: Thurisazvirus

Synonyms
- Tome's spiny-rat virus 1 (TSRV-1); RDev

Genus of viruses

Thurisazvirus is a genus of viruses in the realm Ribozyviria, containing the single species Thurisazvirus myis. Tome's spiny rat (Proechimys semispinosus) serves as its host.
