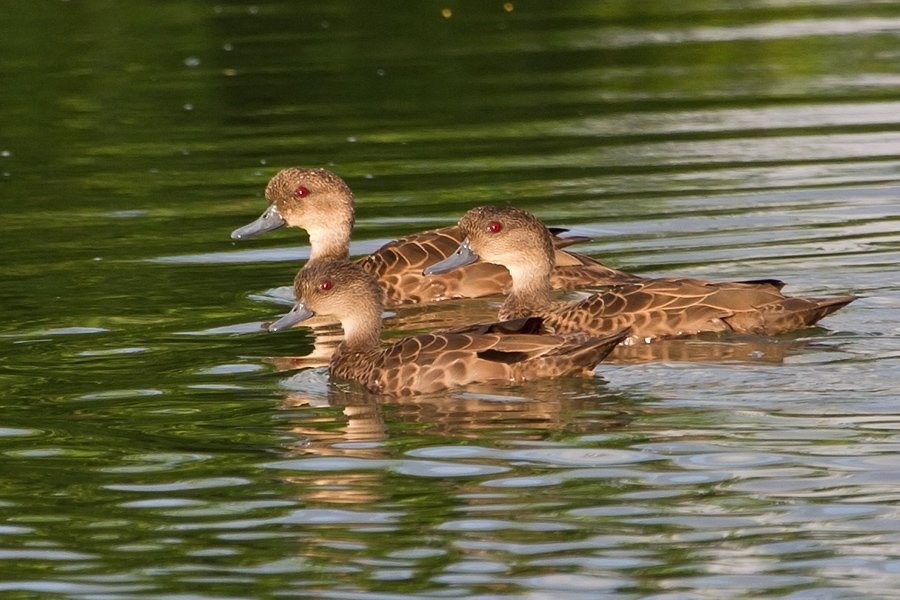

Conservation status
- Least Concern (IUCN 3.1)

Scientific classification
- Kingdom: Animalia
- Phylum: Chordata
- Class: Aves
- Order: Anseriformes
- Family: Anatidae
- Genus: Anas
- Species: A. gibberifrons

Binomial name
- Anas gibberifrons Müller, 1842

= Sunda teal =

Species of bird

The Sunda teal (Anas gibberifrons), also known as the Bebek cokelat or Itik benjut, is a dabbling duck found in open wetlands in Indonesia and Timor-Leste. The species formerly included the Andaman teal Anas albogularis and the grey teal, Anas gracilis as subspecies, but is currently considered monotypic.

A molecular phylogentic study published in 2009 that compared mitochondrial DNA sequences from ducks, geese and swans in the family Anatidae found that the Sunda teal is a sister species of the chestnut teal (Anas castanea) native to Australia.

This is a mottled brown duck with white and green flashes on its wings. The male and female Sunda teal share the same colouration, in contrast to the related chestnut teal, whose male and female are strikingly different. The nominate Sunda teal has almost identical colouration to the female chestnut teal and can only be distinguished by its lighter coloured neck, paler face and especially the bulging forehead. The Andaman teal has a variable amount of white on the forehead and around the eyes. The Rennell Island teal looked like a smaller version of the nominate subspecies, with a stubbier bill. Juveniles are paler than adults, especially on the head.

The Sunda teal nests near its favoured freshwater lakes and marshes, usually on the ground, but also in tree holes or rabbit burrows.

This is a vocal duck, especially at night. The male gives a soft peep, and the female has a loud quack.
