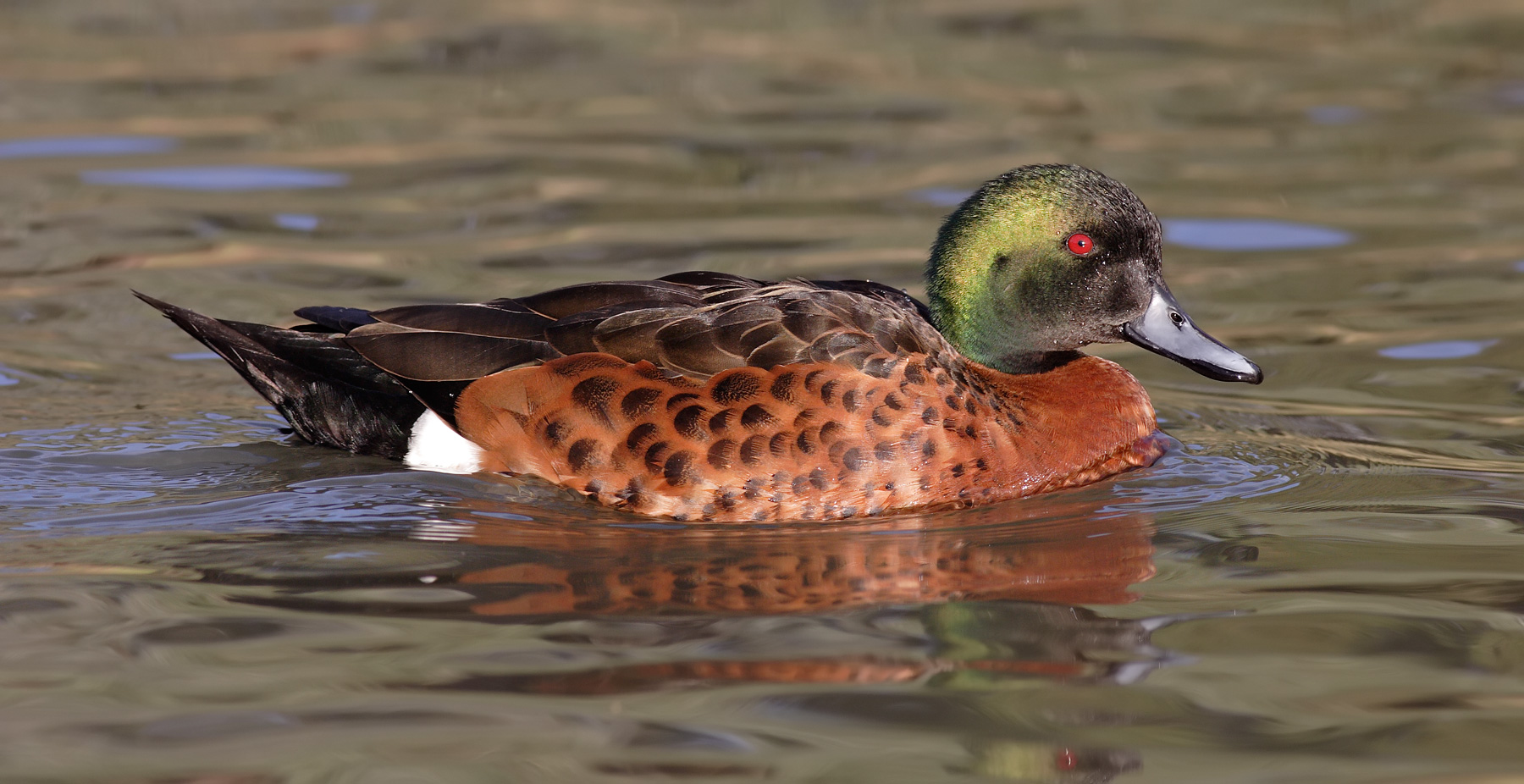
- Male
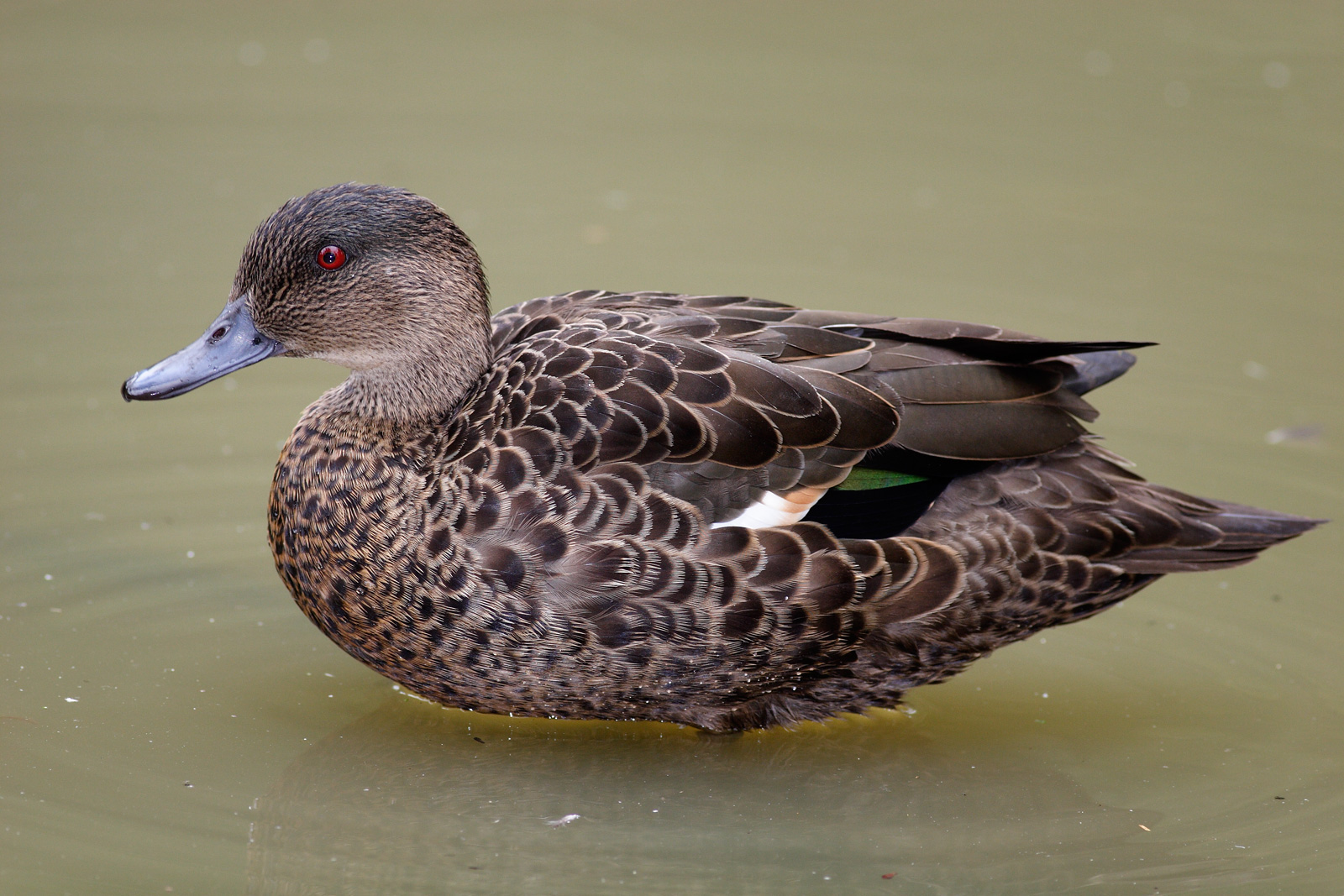
- Female

Conservation status
- Least Concern (IUCN 3.1)

Scientific classification
- Kingdom: Animalia
- Phylum: Chordata
- Class: Aves
- Order: Anseriformes
- Family: Anatidae
- Genus: Anas
- Species: A. castanea

Binomial name
- Anas castanea (Eyton, 1838)
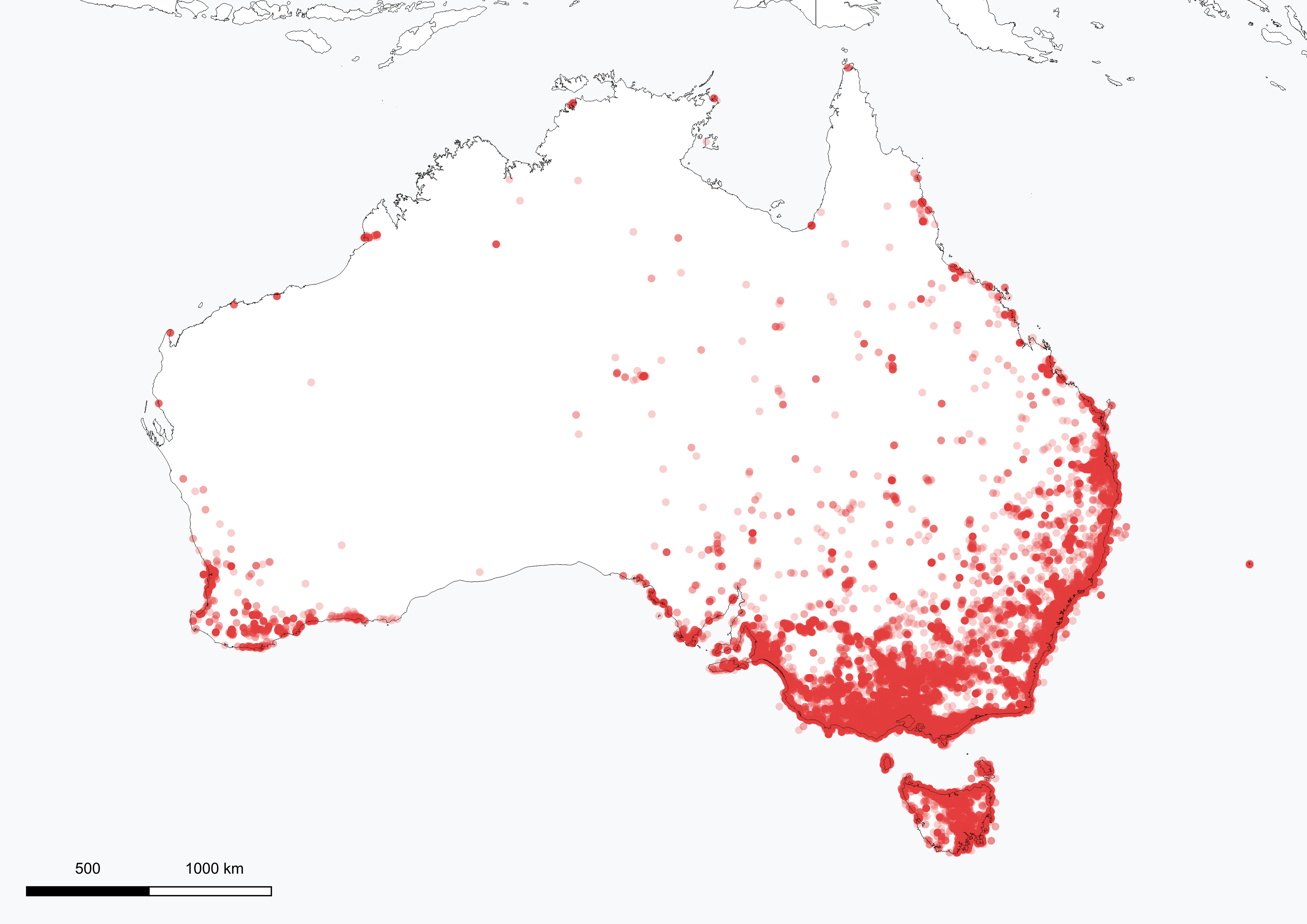
- Species distribution

= Chestnut teal =

Species of duck

The chestnut teal (Anas castanea) is a dabbling duck found in Australia. It is protected under the National Parks and Wildlife Act 1974.

== Taxonomy ==
The chestnut teal was described by the English naturalist Thomas Campbell Eyton in 1838 under the binomial name Mareca castanea. The specific epithet castanea is from the Latin castaneus for "chestnut-coloured" or "chestnut-brown".

A large molecular phylogentic study that compared mitochondrial DNA sequences from ducks, geese and swans in the family Anatidae found that the chestnut teal is a sister species to the Sunda teal (Anas gibberifrons) that is endemic to Indonesia.

== Description ==
The chestnut teal is darker and a slightly bigger bird than the grey teal.

The male has a distinctive green coloured head and mottled brown body. The female has a brown head and mottled brown body. The female is almost identical in appearance to the grey teal.

The female chestnut teal has a loud penetrating "laughing" quack repeated rapidly nine times or more.

== Distribution and habitat ==
The chestnut teal is commonly distributed in south-eastern and south-western Australia, while vagrants may occur elsewhere. Tasmania and southern Victoria are the species' stronghold, while vagrants have been found as far north as New Guinea and Lord Howe Island, and as far south as New Zealand.

The chestnut teal prefers coastal estuaries and wetlands, and is indifferent to salinity. This bird is an omnivore.

== Breeding ==
Chestnut teals form monogamous pairs that stay together outside the breeding season, defend the nest site and look after the young when hatched. Nests are usually located over water, in a down-lined tree hollow about 6–10 m (20–33 ft) high. Sometimes nests are placed on the ground, among clumps of grass near water. The young hatch and are ready to swim and walk within a day.

== See also ==
- Dalvirus anatis
