= Ribozyviria =

- Ribbon diagram of a self-cleaved form of the genomic HDV ribozyme

Virus classification
- (unranked): Virus
- Realm: Ribozyviria
- Family: Kolmioviridae

Genera
- See text

Realm of viruses

Ribozyviria is a realm of animal viruses. Viruses in the realm are characterized by the presence of ribozymes in the genome that are involved in replication by cleaving themselves. The genome is made of ribonucleic acid (RNA) and is a negative-sense, single-stranded molecule. The genome encodes one protein, the delta antigen (DAg), which associates with the genome to form a rod-shaped ribonucleoprotein (RNP) complex. The RNP complex is surrounded by an envelope that has envelope proteins from a helper virus. The best-studied ribozyvirian is the hepatitis D virus (HDV), and its helper virus is the hepatitis B virus. Because of the dependency on helper viruses, ribozyvirians infect the same cells as their helper viruses.

Ribozyvirians infect cells by attaching to the surface with helper virus-derived spike proteins on the surface of the envelope. The envelope fuses with the cell membrane, releasing the RNP into the cell, where it moves to the nucleus for replication. A host RNA polymerase replicates the genome in a double rolling circle process, during which individual progeny genomes are excised from strands of numerous consecutive genomes by viral ribozymes. The DAg protein is translated from messenger RNA and binds to the genome. Envelopes are then obtained before progeny viruses leave the cell.

Ribozyvirians infect insects and a wide range of vertebrates, including amphibians, birds, fish, mammals, and reptiles. In humans, HDV causes the liver disease hepatitis D, with symptoms such as cirrhosis, hepatitis, and liver cancer. The origin of ribozyvirians is unclear, but they have been proposed to originate from an escaped gene from a cellular host or mis-spliced RNA. HDV was the first virus of the realm to be discovered, in 1977, and was the only known ribozyvirian for about 40 years. Starting in the late 2010s, other members began to be discovered, and in 2021, both the realm Ribozyviria and its sole family, Kolmioviridae, were established.

== Classification ==
Ribozyviria contains one family, Kolmioviridae, with no intermediate taxa between the ranks of realm and family. Kolmioviridae contains 11 genera:

- Realm: Ribozyviria
  - Family: Kolmioviridae
    - Genus: Daazvirus
    - Genus: Dagazvirus
    - Genus: Daletvirus
    - Genus: Dalvirus
    - Genus: Deevirus
    - Genus: Deltavirus, also called the hepatitis D virus
    - Genus: Dobrovirus
    - Genus: Donvirus
    - Genus: Perideltavirus
    - Genus: Perithurisazvirus
    - Genus: Thurisazvirus

== Characteristics ==
=== Genome and proteins ===
Ribozyvirians have negative-sense (–) single-stranded (ss) genomes made of ribonucleic acid (RNA) that are about 1.5–1.7 kilobases in length. The genome is a non-segmented, covalently-closed circular RNA (cccRNA) molecule that organizes into a rod-like shape due to a high amount of self-complementarity. Their genomes contain at least two ribozymes: one on the genomic (negative-sense) strand, and one on the antigenomic (positive-sense) strand. Ribozymes are enzymes made of RNA that can catalyze chemical reactions, and the HDV ribozymes cleave themselves. The only protein encoded by ribozyvirians is the delta antigen (DAg), encoded in the antigenome. Some deltaviruses express two forms of DAg, called small delta antigen (S-DAg) and large delta antigen (L-DAg). S-DAg and L-DAg are almost identical; the only difference is that L-DAg contains 19 or 20 additional amino acid residues, created through genome editing by the host.

=== Structure ===
A diagram of hepatitis D virion structure. It codes for its nucleocapsid proteins, while the envelope proteins are from a helper virus, the hepatitis B virus.

The structure of ribozyvirians has only been detailed for deltaviruses. The extracellular particles (virions) of deltaviruses are roughly spherical and about 36–43 nanometers in diameter. Virions consist of a rod-shaped genomic ribonucleoprotein (RNP) complex surrounded by a viral envelope with envelope proteins derived from a helper virus. For HDV, the envelope proteins originate from the hepatitis B virus. The RNP complex consists of the genome and the nucleoprotein DAg, which associates with the genome. The envelope proteins include S-HBsAg, M-HBsAg, and L-HBsAg, though M-HBsAg is not thought to be essential for HDV to infect cells. The quantity of S-DAg and L-DAg bound to the genome is variable, but there is about a 70 to 1 protein:RNA ratio. DAg has an alpha-helical fold and forms into complexes of eight DAg proteins (octamers), and it is believed that the genome wraps around these octamers.

=== Life cycle ===
The replication process of ribozyvirians is only known for deltaviruses. They enter host cells by attaching to receptors on the cell surface with their envelope proteins, which are derived from helper viruses. Because of this dependency on helper viruses, ribozyvirians infect the same cells as their helper viruses. After attachment, the envelope fuses with the host cell membrane, releasing the RNP complex into the cell. There, the RNP moves to the cell nucleus, where the genome is replicated. The genome is replicated during a double rolling circle process by a host DNA-directed RNA polymerase II enzyme. During replication, ribozymes in the antigenome and genome cleave concatemers of linear antigenomes and genomes and ligate (i.e., connect) individual linear progeny strands into a circular form.

DAg facilitates the recruitment of chromatin remodeling complexes and the host RNA polymerase II, which begins the replication process by progressing in a loop around the genome, producing a continuous, linear strand of numerous copies (a concatemer) of the antigenome. Ribozymes in the antigenome self-cleave the concatemer to produce individual linear antigenomes. These strands ligate to produce circular antigenomic molecules. The circular antigenome is then replicated in the same manner as the genome, creating a concatemer of genomic strands. Ribozymes in the genome self-cleave this concatemer to produce individual linear genomes, which are ligated into circular genomic molecules.

Messenger RNA (mRNA) encoding DAg is transcribed from the negative-sense genome. Expression of DAg induces packaging of RNPs into envelopes made from the Golgi apparatus. These envelopes contain proteins of the helper virus and facilitate budding from the surface of the cell. For deltaviruses, the envelope of hepatitis B virus (HBV) is recruited through farnesylation, which is a post-translational attachment of a hydrophobic molecule to a cysteine residue at the end (C-terminus) of L-DAg's amino acid sequence. This facilitates an interaction between the RNP and the HBV envelope to recruit the envelope. Only genomic RNA molecules that fold into a rod-shape and have DAgs bound to them are packaged into virions. Antigenomes (i.e., positive-sense strands) are not found in virions.

==== Dependency on helper viruses ====
All ribozyvirians are believed to be dependent on helpers viruses that are not related by evolution to them to complete their life cycle, as autonomous ribozyvirians that do not rely on helper viruses have not been discovered. Identified helper viruses include hepatitis B virus for deltaviruses and arenaviruses for daletviruses. Other potential helper viruses include flaviviruses, herpesviruses, poxviruses, and retroviruses.

== Distribution ==
Ribozyvirians are found in insects and a variety of vertebrates, including amphibians, birds, fish, reptiles, mammals such as rodents, as well as in humans. Specific species include common vampire bats, groundhogs, white-tailed deer, white-rumped munias, yellow-bellied tits, Australian zebra finches, and the fungus-growing termite Odontotermes wallonensis. In addition to animals, metagenomic searches have identified ribozyvirian-like cccRNAs that encode homologs of DAg replicating in what are likely unicellular eukaryotes, suggesting a wider host range than what is known.

== Phylogenetics ==
Ribozyvirians are not related to other –ssRNA viruses, which share common ancestry as they all encode RNA-dependent RNA polymerases. Some characteristics of ribozyvirians are similar to viroids, virusoids, and other replicons, such as genome structure, RNA transcription by means of a host DNA-directed RNA polymerase II, the presence of ribozymes, and RNA-to-RNA double rolling circle replication. The evolutionary origins of ribozyvirians and viroids, however, is unclear, as is their relationship with each other. It has been proposed that ribozyvirians originate as an escaped gene from a cellular host, or as a result of mis-spliced RNA, from an ancient animal host or from a plant that transmitted the ancestral virus to animals.

Within the family Kolmioviridae, genera are distinguished by the amino acid sequence similarity of the DAg protein. Viruses with less than or equal to 60% sequence similarity are assigned to different genera. A phylogenetic tree of ribozyvirian genera based on the DAg protein is shown hereafter:

- Ribozyviria / Kolmioviridae
  - - - - - Perithurisazvirus
          - Thurisazvirus
        - Daletvirus
      - - Perideltavirus
        - Deltavirus, i.e., hepatitis D virus
    - - Dalvirus
      - - Deevirus
        - - Daazvirus
          - Dobrovirus
  - - Dagazvirus
    - Donvirus

== Interactions with hosts ==
Among ribozyvirians, only deltaviruses (i.e., HDV) are known to cause disease. In humans, they primarily infect liver cells and can cause hepatitis D, with symptoms such as cirrhosis, hepatitis, and liver cancer. Deltaviruses infect an estimated 10–20 million people worldwide, about 5% of hepatitis B virus carriers. HDV is entirely dependent on hepatitis B virus proteins for replication, but it can also use flavivirus, hepacivirus, and vesiculovirus glycoproteins in place of HBV proteins.

== History ==
The first ribozyvirian discovered was the hepatitis D virus. The delta antigen HDAg was discovered in 1977 by Italian virologist Mario Rizzetto and his colleagues and was initially thought to be an antigen of the hepatitis B virus. Further research showed that HDAg was associated with a separate virus, HDV. For about 40 years, HDV was the only known ribozyvirian. Other ribozyvirians started to be discovered in the late 2010s. In 2021, both Ribozyviria and Kolmioviridae were established.

=== Etymology ===
Ribozyviria takes the first part of its name from the word "ribozyme", a core characteristic of viruses in the realm. The second part, -viria, is the suffix used for virus realms. Kolmioviridae derives the first part of its name from the Finnish word "kolmio", meaning triangle, a reference to the Greek letter Δ (Delta) spelled out in the name of the genus Deltavirus. The second part is the suffix used for virus families, -viridae.

== See also ==
- List of higher virus taxa
- Retrozyme
- Viroid
