= North Victorian Wetlands =

Wetlands in Victoria, Australia

Coordinates: 35°47′17″S 144°01′35″E

Designations

Ramsar Wetland
- Official name: Kerang Wetlands
- Designated: 15 December 1982
- Reference no.: 265

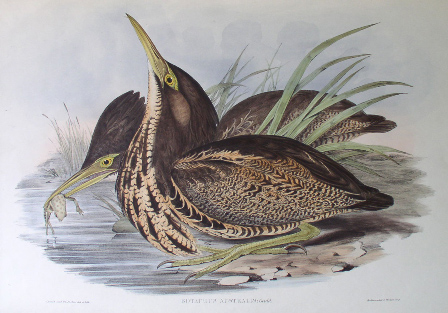
The wetlands are important for Australasian bitterns

The North Victorian Wetlands, also known as the Kerang Wetlands, comprise an extensive series of over 100 freshwater, brackish and saline lakes and swamps on the floodplain of the Loddon River where it enters the Murray valley, in the vicinity of the town of Kerang, in northern Victoria, south-eastern Australia. They are important for a variety, and sometimes large numbers, of waterbirds.

== Description ==
The wetlands lie about 300 km north-west of Melbourne. Many of them are regulated and linked to the regional irrigation system. Many are also affected by salinity caused by land clearance, agriculture and irrigation practices, resulting in raised levels of groundwater and highly saline watertables. Many of the lakes are used recreationally for sightseeing, hunting, fishing, boating, waterskiing and swimming; some are used for storing irrigation water, or for the disposal of saline water and sewage.

== Important Bird Area ==
A subset of 12 wetlands with a collective area of 60 km^{2}, defined as those which have recently supported significant numbers of birds, have been identified by BirdLife International as an Important Bird Area (IBA). They support populations of endangered Australasian bitterns and near threatened blue-billed ducks. They sometimes support over 1% of the world populations of freckled ducks, straw-necked ibises, black-fronted dotterels, banded stilts and red-necked avocets.

Other birds recorded as sometimes occurring on the wetlands in relatively substantial numbers include black swans, Pacific black ducks, grey teals, Australian shelducks, Australasian shovellers, pink-eared ducks, hardheads, black-backed bitterns, Australian white ibises, hoary-headed grebes, Eurasian coots, sharp-tailed sandpipers, red-necked stints, marsh sandpipers, white-headed stilts, double-banded plovers, red-kneed dotterels, red-capped plovers and whiskered terns. Australian painted snipes have been recorded from Hird Swamp in the IBA.

== Ramsar site ==
A larger and overlapping subset of 22 wetlands, with a collective area of 94 km^{2}, were recognised on 15 December 1982 as being of international importance when they were listed under the Ramsar Convention as Ramsar Site 265. The wetlands were so recognised because of their great importance to waterbirds, supporting large numbers of endemic and migratory species, and serving as a drought refuge, as well as supporting rare or vulnerable plant species.
