= Dagazvirus =

Virus classification
- (unranked): Virus
- Realm: Ribozyviria
- Family: Kolmioviridae
- Genus: Dagazvirus

Synonyms
- Rhinotermitid virus 1 (RTV-1); rHDV

Genus of viruses

Dagazvirus is a genus of viruses in the realm Ribozyviria, containing the single species Dagazvirus schedorhinotermitis. It is the only species within its realm known to be hosted by an invertebrate animal, the termite Schedorhinotermes intermedius.
