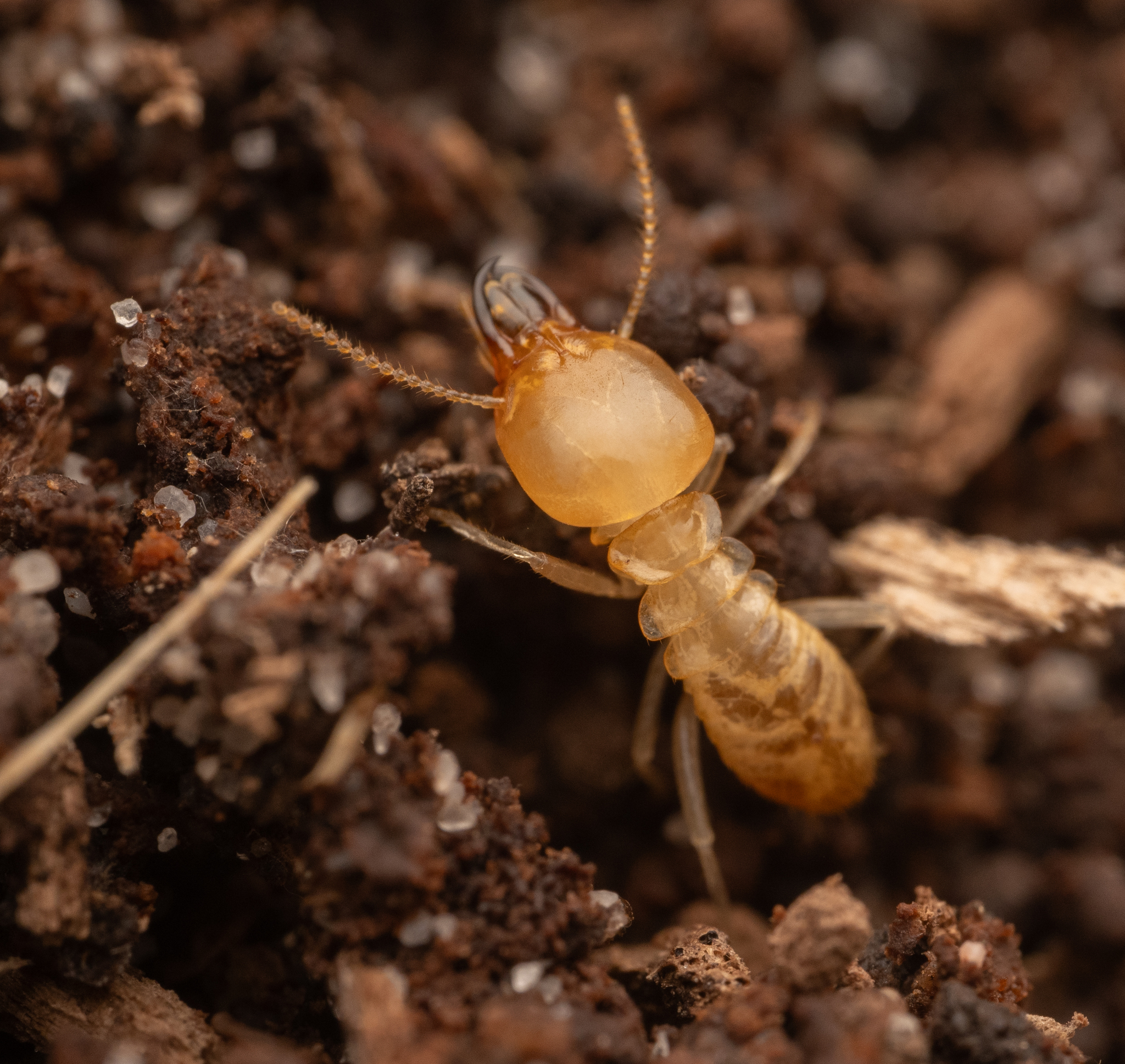

Scientific classification
- Domain: Eukaryota
- Kingdom: Animalia
- Phylum: Arthropoda
- Class: Insecta
- Order: Blattodea
- Infraorder: Isoptera
- Family: Rhinotermitidae
- Genus: Schedorhinotermes
- Species: S. intermedius

Binomial name
- Schedorhinotermes intermedius (Brauer, 1865)

Synonyms
- Rhinotermes intermedius Brauer, 1865

= Schedorhinotermes intermedius =

Species of termite

Schedorhinotermes intermedius is a species of termite in the family Rhinotermitidae, endemic to eastern Australia.

== Description ==
Members of the worker caste possess internally serrated mandibles, a centrally grooved labrum, a fontanelle, and a flat pronotum with no anterior lobes. The soldier caste is dimorphic, with major and minor soldiers. The major soldier is 5.0–7.5 mm long, whereas the minor soldier is 3.0–5.0 mm long, with a narrower head, more slender mandibles, and longer labrum that extends to the tip of the mandibles.

== Distribution and habitat ==
This species is distributed from south-eastern Queensland to just south of Sydney, mainly in coastal regions. In nature they build their nests in tree stumps, but they have become a serious pest of timber.

== See also ==
- Dagazvirus schedorhinotermitis
