= Schedorhinotermes =

Scientific classification
- Domain: Eukaryota
- Kingdom: Animalia
- Phylum: Arthropoda
- Class: Insecta
- Order: Blattodea
- Infraorder: Isoptera
- Nanorder: Neoisoptera
- Family: Rhinotermitidae
- Subfamily: Rhinotermitinae
- Genus: Schedorhinotermes; Silvestri 1909 (Silvestri in Holmgren 1909: 289)

Species
- See text

Genus of termites

Schedorhinotermes is a South-East Asian and Australasian genus of termites in the family Rhinotermitidae.

== Species ==
The Termite Catalogue lists the following Schedorhinotermes species:

- Schedorhinotermes actuosus
- Schedorhinotermes bidentatus
- Schedorhinotermes brachyceps
- Schedorhinotermes breinli
- Schedorhinotermes brevialatus
- Schedorhinotermes butteli
- Schedorhinotermes derosus
- Schedorhinotermes eleanorae
- Schedorhinotermes fortignathus
- Schedorhinotermes ganlanbaensis
- Schedorhinotermes holmgreni
- Schedorhinotermes insolitus
- Schedorhinotermes intermedius
- Schedorhinotermes lamanianus
- Schedorhinotermes leopoldi
- Schedorhinotermes longirostris
- Schedorhinotermes magnus
- Schedorhinotermes makassarensis
- Schedorhinotermes makilingensis
- Schedorhinotermes malaccensis
- Schedorhinotermes medioobscurus
- Schedorhinotermes nancowriensis
- Schedorhinotermes putorius
- Schedorhinotermes pyricephalus
- Schedorhinotermes rectangularis
- Schedorhinotermes reticulatus
- Schedorhinotermes robustior
- Schedorhinotermes sanctaecrucis
- Schedorhinotermes seclusus
- Schedorhinotermes solomonensis
- Schedorhinotermes tenuis
- Schedorhinotermes tiwarii
- Schedorhinotermes translucens
- Schedorhinotermes umbraticus

== See also ==
- Dagazvirus schedorhinotermitis
