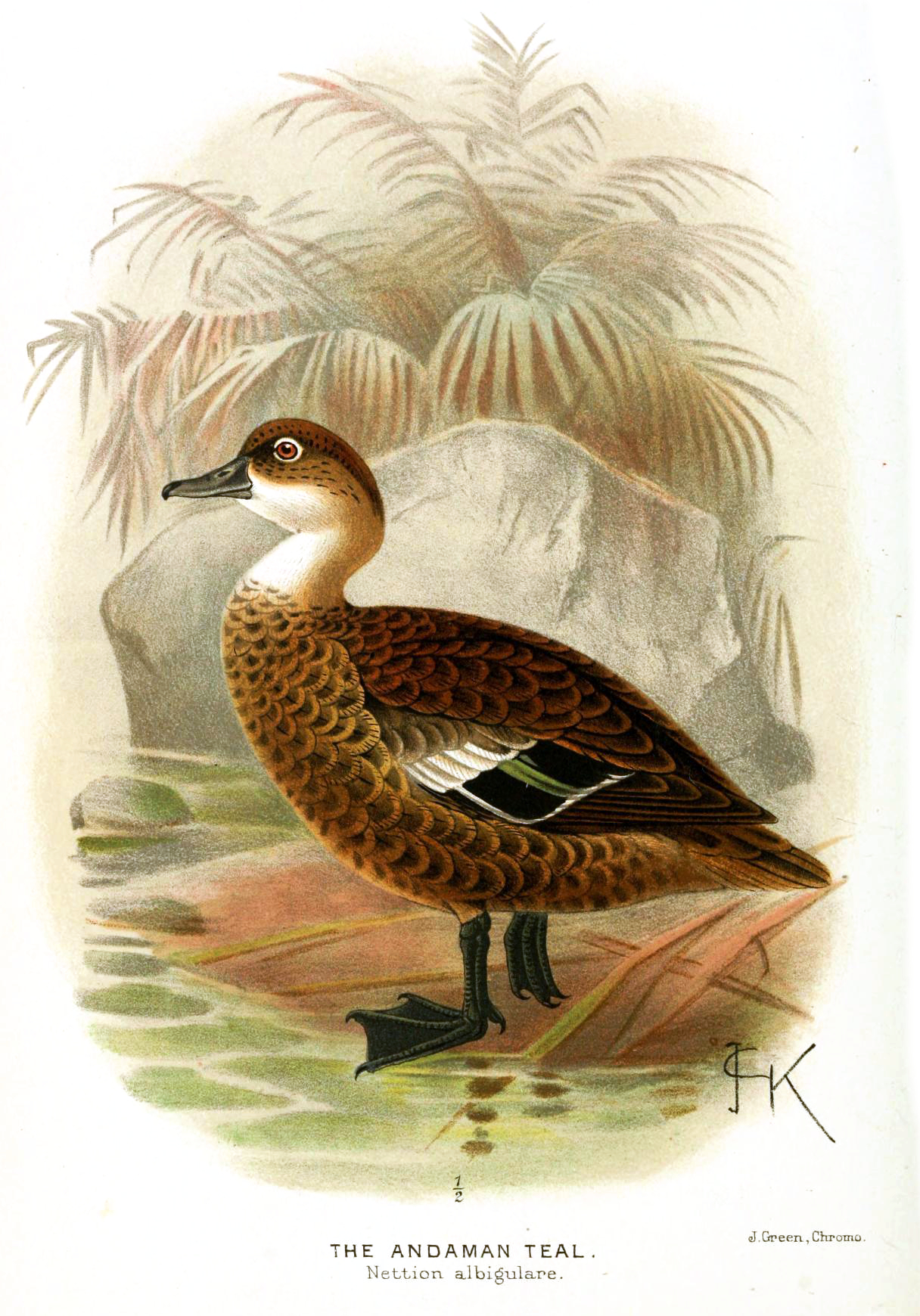
- Illustration by Keulemans (1908)

Conservation status
- Near Threatened (IUCN 3.1)

Scientific classification
- Kingdom: Animalia
- Phylum: Chordata
- Class: Aves
- Order: Anseriformes
- Family: Anatidae
- Genus: Anas
- Species: A. albogularis

Binomial name
- Anas albogularis (Hume, 1873)

Synonyms
- Mareca albogularis Hume, 1873; Nettium albigulare Nettion albigulare

= Andaman teal =

Species of bird

The Andaman teal (Anas albogularis) is a species of duck endemic to the Andaman archipelago in the Bay of Bengal. The species was formerly considered as a subspecies of the Sunda teal.

== Taxonomy ==
The first formal description of the Andaman teal was by the English ornithologist Allan Octavian Hume in 1873 under the binomial name Mareca albogularis. It is now placed with many other dabbling ducks in the genus Anas. It was formerly considered as a subspecies of the Sunda teal (Anas gibberifrons) that is found in Indonesia.

== Description ==
The species is dark brown with buffy markings. The face and throat are pale with a white ring around the eye. The bill is bluish grey and the iris is red.

== Distribution and habitat ==
Andaman teals are endemic to the Andaman Islands (India) and Great Coco Island (Burma). They are found in inland pools as well as mangroves and lagoons. A population estimate of 500 to 600 individuals was made in a survey conducted in 1995–98, and 674 were counted in 2005. Their population has been on the increase for the last few decades, and was most recently estimated in 2014 to have slightly more than 1,000 individuals.

== Behaviour ==
They feed at night in rice fields. The breeding season is July to October and nests in reed patches. The nest is made of grass and about nine eggs forms the clutch. They were formerly considered to breed in tree hollows but recent studies found no evidence. They feed mainly on molluscs and arthropods.
