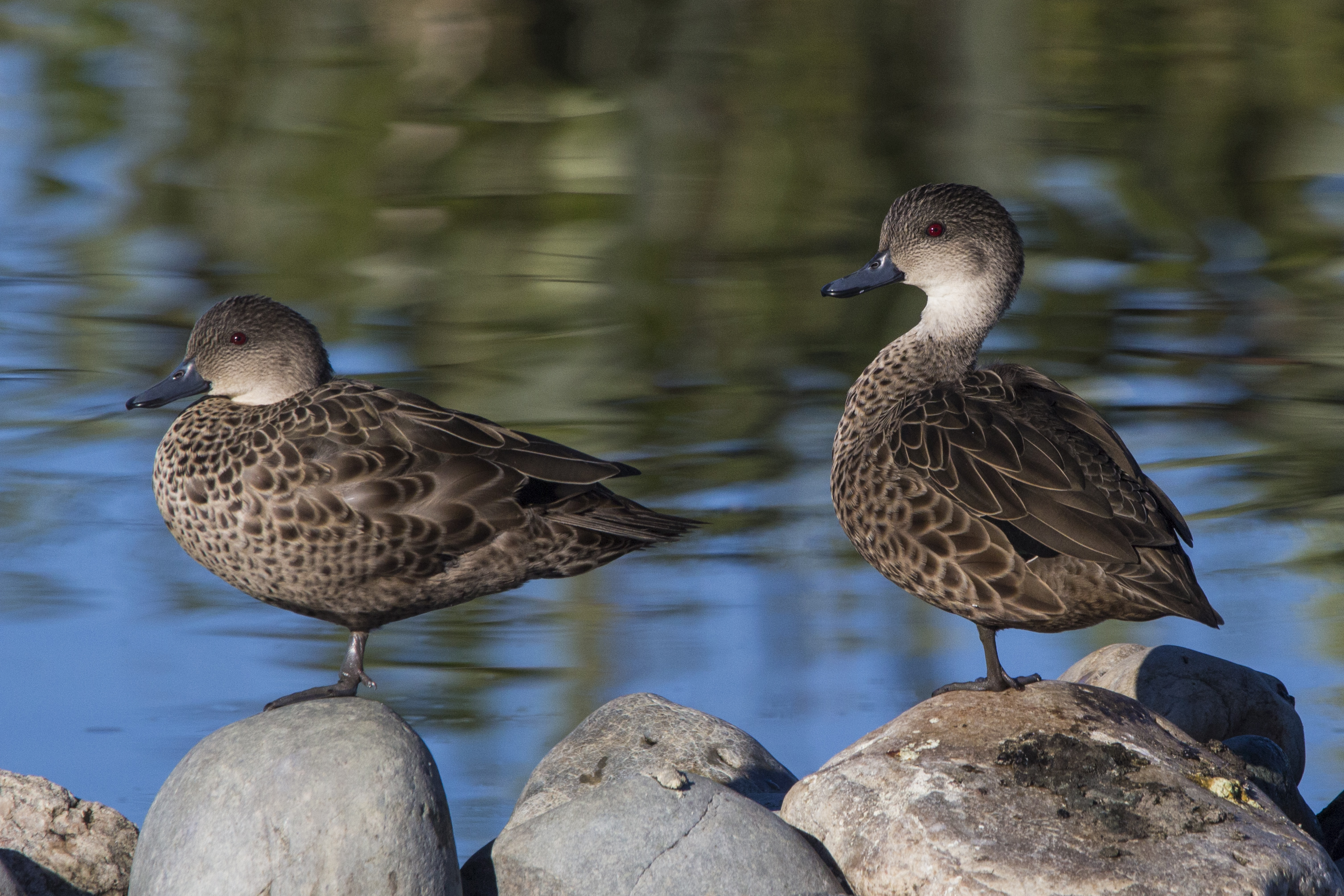

Conservation status
- Least Concern (IUCN 3.1)

Scientific classification
- Kingdom: Animalia
- Phylum: Chordata
- Class: Aves
- Order: Anseriformes
- Family: Anatidae
- Genus: Anas
- Species: A. gracilis

Binomial name
- Anas gracilis Buller, 1869
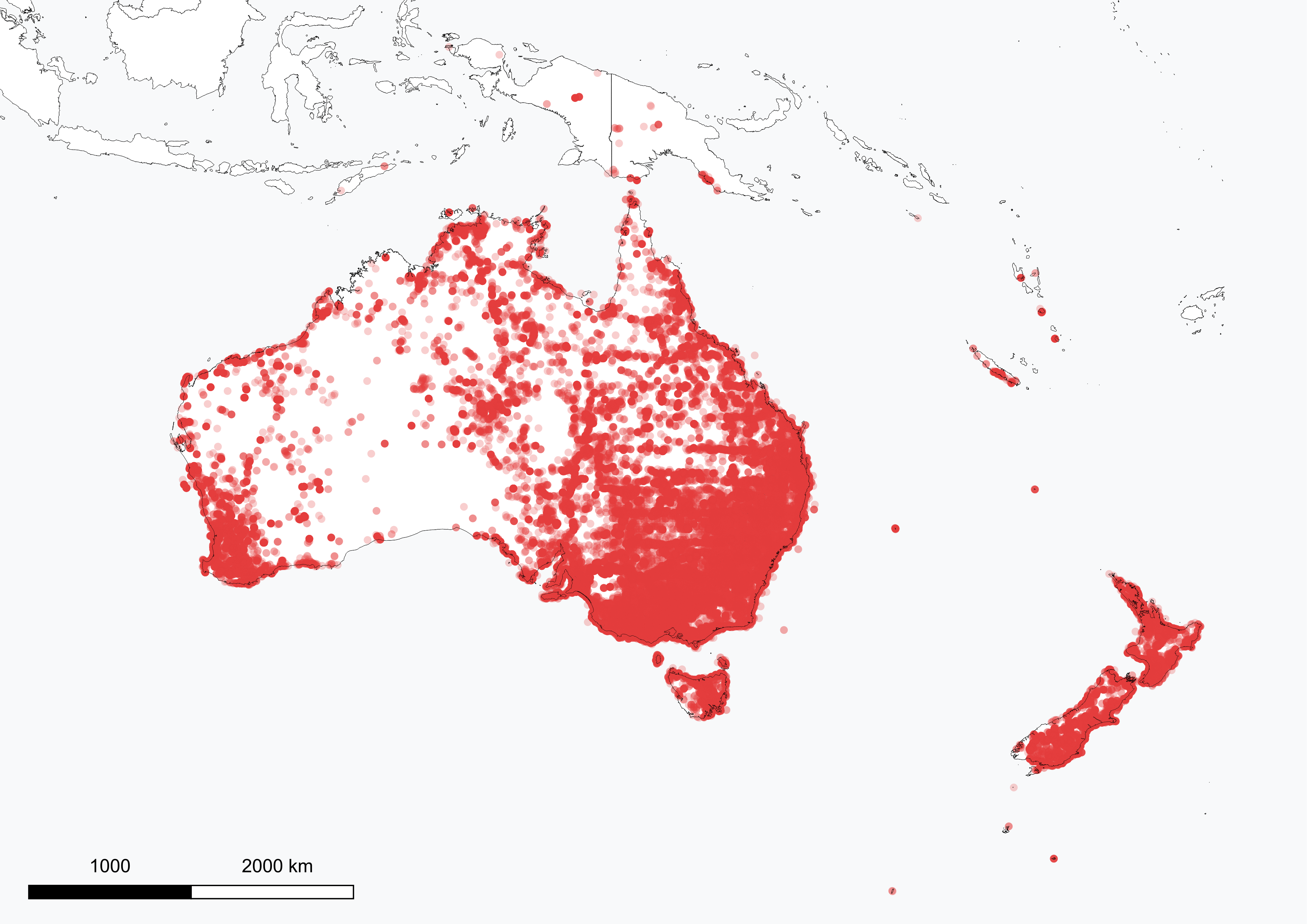
- Species distribution

Synonyms
- Anas gibberifrons gracilis

= Grey teal =

Species of duck

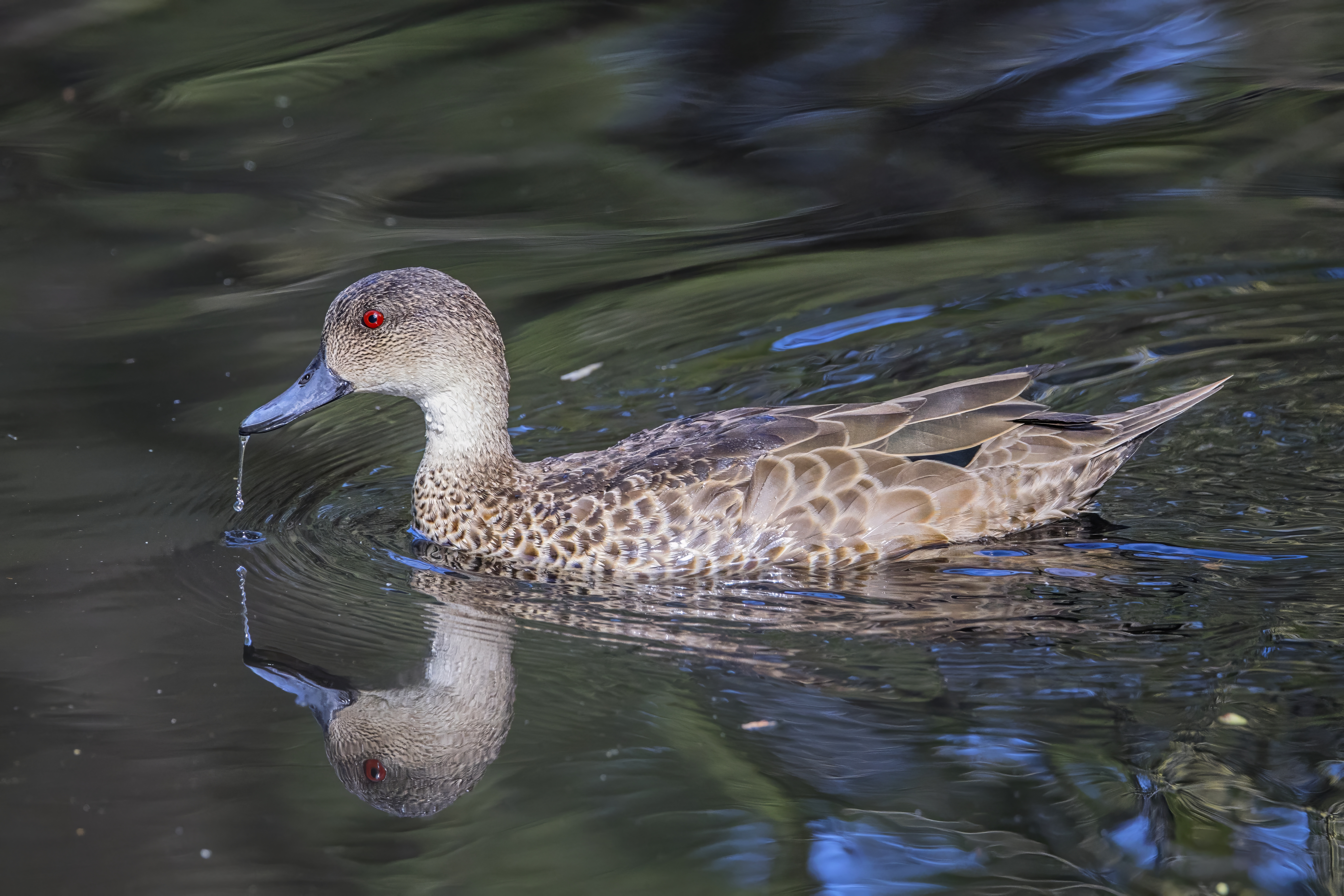
In Adelaide Botanic Garden

The grey teal (Anas gracilis) is a dabbling duck found in open wetlands in Australia and New Zealand.

== Description ==
It is identified by the presence of a crimson coloured iris in its eyes, which is relatively more prominent in adult males.

It is a mottled brown duck with white and green flashes on its wings. Males and females share the same colouration, in contrast to the related chestnut teal, male and female of which are strikingly different. The grey teal has almost identical colouration to the female chestnut teal and the grey can only be distinguished by its lighter coloured neck and paler face. Juveniles are paler than adults, especially on the head. However, they can be identified by having a dull brown eye until matured. The bill of the grey teal is a blue-grey colour with dark lining around the edges. Feet are a similar colour to that of the bill being grey. The head of the grey teal can be described as plain/slightly streaked, with a dark crown and cream coloured chin/throat and cheeks.

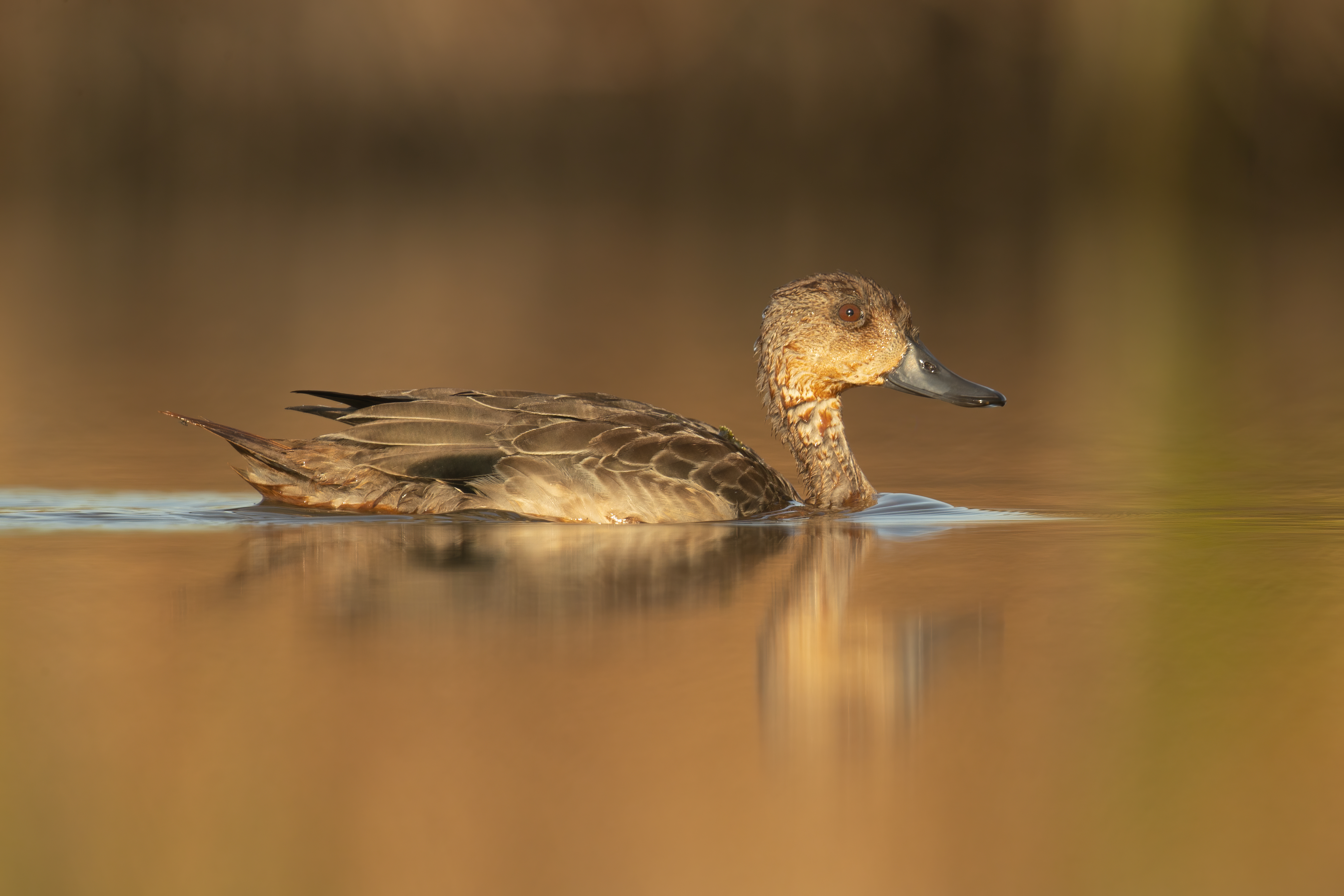
Juvenile grey teal

The eggs of the grey teal are creamy white and are not distinctly speckled. An average egg is 49.3 mm (1.94 in) in length and 35.6 mm (1.40 in) in width. The grey teal nests near its favoured freshwater lakes and marshes, usually on the ground, but also in tree holes or rabbit burrows.

It is a vocal duck, especially at night. The male gives a soft preep, and the female has a loud quack.

The grey teal is a gregarious species. It is nomadic in Australia, rapidly colonising suitable habitat following rain. In 1957, large numbers fled Australia, moving to New Zealand to escape a drought.

Adult grey teal, Anas gracilis, undergo a flightless moult that is not fixed in the year. Before the breeding season, mature birds, both male and female, will undergo a body moult that excludes the wings. After the breeding season, both partners will undergo a complete body moult (including wings). According to Janet Kear (2005), in Australia the moult of this species is correlated with climate conditions. Indeed, during a prolonged wet season birds postpone wing moult in order to extend the breeding season, probably to better exploit wetlands resources.

That postponement could be explained by the fact that ducks try not to moult and breed at the same time. For some species of birds it is impossible to do both simultaneously. The tendency seems to be that body moult (including wings) generally occurs between the months of January to March. Juveniles will undergo a moult of the entire body other than the wings, which occurs in the first autumn or early winter.

The grey teal was formerly considered a subspecies of the Sunda teal, as Anas gibberifrons gracilis.

Widespread throughout its large range, it is evaluated as "Least Concern" on the IUCN Red List of Threatened Species.

== Range ==
Stanthorpe, S. Queensland, Australia

=== Natural global range ===
The grey teal can be found as a breeding species a number of places across the globe: Australia, New Zealand, New Guinea and Indonesia. However, it can also be seen in the Solomons and New Caledonia, where it is vagrant.

=== New Zealand range ===
The grey teal is a self-introduced species to New Zealand, arriving from Australia, where it is much more abundant. It was rare in New Zealand until the 1950s, but several natural events in Australia led to a huge increase in numbers. Now, it is a very common waterbird and can be found throughout New Zealand, where its Māori name is tētē.

There are areas where the species is more concentrated (larger populations), such as the districts of Hawke's Bay, Waikato, South Auckland and Otago. Grey teal are also more likely to be found in the Canterbury region and more specifically around Lake Ellesmere. Anas gracilis has also been seen wandering in the small New Zealand islands such as Chatham Islands (July 1951, December 1998) or Snares Islands (November 1987). In general the New Zealand grey teal population is smaller than the Australian population.

== Habitat ==
The grey teal prefers to live in habitats of shallow water areas including lagoons, swamps and shallow freshwater lakes. Preference for shallower waters means that it is easier for ducklings to be able to swim and eat, which aids the rearing and survival of juveniles. The grey teal also prefers areas that have a sizeable marginal cover (meaning sufficient plant and vegetation growth around the margins), therefore they are not often seen in open spaces. Although it tends to choose freshwater sites during the breeding season, it is also known to be seen in coastal/salt waters occasionally, as well as slightly brackish waters. In terms of elevation the grey teal does not tend to populate in areas above 900 m (3,000 ft) above sea level; instead it prefers areas that are below 300 m (980 ft) above sea level. When nesting grey teal choose to create their nests amongst vegetation on the ground level, this vegetation may include reeds and tall grasses. They often also elevate nests above ground in tree hollows.

== Ecology ==
=== Reproduction ===
When establishing a pair-bond, male grey teal will perform a series of displays; some of these include headshakes and head rolls. These displays tend to occur in adolescent birds before breeding season, whereas for mature birds in established pair-bonds courtship rituals are used. This is because grey teal pair-bonds are long term and monogamous, which means they keep the same mate through multiple seasons. Couples stay together all year; however, when late summer moult comes they often join large flocks and stay with them until July. Moreover, "after breeding, [they] often gather at estuaries to feed on exposed mudflats".

On average, the grey teal starts breeding at one year old. In Australia there is no reproductive season as breeding is linked to rainfall and food abundance. The species had to adapt and breed in shallow temporary water. However, in New Zealand where the climate is more humid, breeding is more seasonal even if it is still related to water level. In terms of seasonality, grey teal will tend to breed in the summer-rainfall period. However, they will also breed at any time after a significant amount of rainfall. Thus, in New Zealand laying occurs between June and September "but replacement clutches can be laid through to January". Therefore, their breeding time seldom shows a seasonal pattern.

Nesting is usually solitary for the grey teal; however, sometimes nesting sites will be close together, meaning breeding pairs may be close to one and other. Nests are often found in tree hollows or hidden amongst vegetation on the ground. The grey teal is not known to construct nests other than using material found from its nesting site: grass and down. Females will create a bowl in the ground that they proceed to fill with litter found around the site as well as surrounding the nest/bowl with down. Between 1–7 eggs will be laid in a nest at a time. Nesting time occurs between the months of June–February in South Australia and slightly later in the area of North Australia due to a slight difference in temperature; whereas in New Zealand grey teal tend to nest between the months of September–November.

During the incubation period, the male will stand guard and protect the female and eggs while she incubates them for 25–31 days. The clutch (group of eggs) size fluctuates, with an average clutch size being between 6–14 eggs. The laying of each egg is done in approximately 24-hour intervals with laying occurring early in the morning. If a pair loses a brood (amount of chicks hatched at the same time) they will then begin to lay again only after a few weeks. Therefore, some pairs may lay several clutches per season. However, on average the grey teal will lay approximately two broods per season.

Female grey teal will brood young by themselves, however, when necessary (e.g. death of the female) the male will take over the brooding role and raise the ducklings. Male will also often be present at the later stages of brooding as the female will return to incubate/lay her next clutch. After hatching, parents and broods may remain close to each other for a number of weeks; once the young gains flight it then becomes independent. However, siblings will often stick together for a short amount of time once they have left home.

Fledging usually occurs between 35 and 40 days. Before that ducklings are grey-brown with off-white cheeks and underpart. For juveniles, both female and male grey teal become reproductively mature at one-year-old. Therefore the forming of a pair-bonding will commonly occur in the first winter.

=== Song ===
The call of the grey teal can be heard as a cuck, cuck, cuck that is relatively rapid and includes a sharp whistle. The male and female calls are different in terms of volume and type. The male's call tends to be more of a whistle, whereas the female's call is very loud and harsh sounding. For short-distance communication, the birds have a softer variation of their calls. The grey teal's voice is very similar if not identical to the voice of a chestnut teal.

=== Migration ===
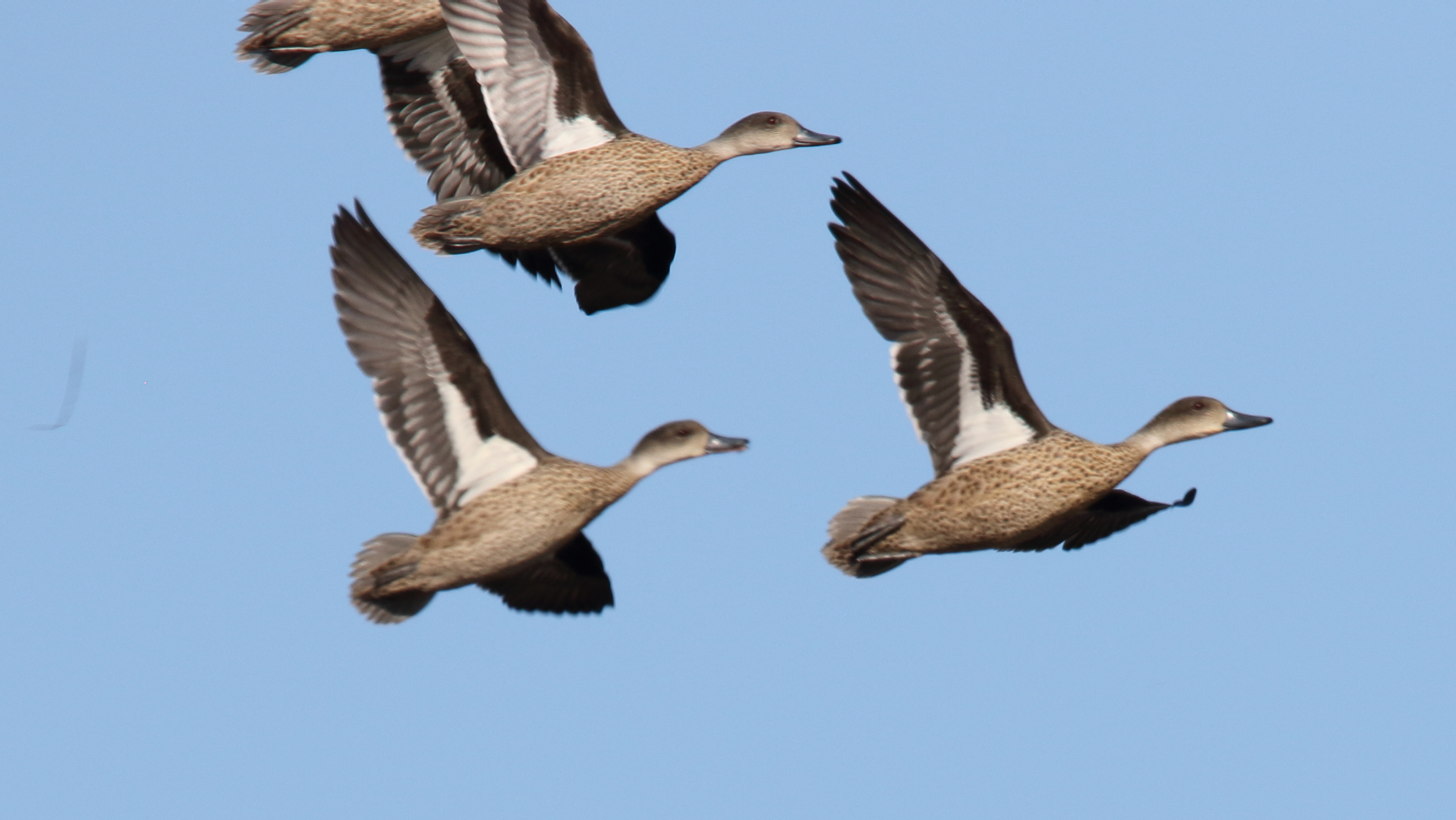
A flock of grey teals

For migratory birds living in stable temperate areas, day length and temperature bring migration about by triggering hormonal changes. However, for birds living in a stochastic environment where resources are often temporary (e.g. grey teal Anas gracilis) hormonal control is less likely to allow good exploitation of resources hence allowing the survival of the species. In this type of environment birds have to be able to detect resourceful locations and relocate, meaning they have to move all year round and do not have a migration season.

The grey teal is a great avian nomad that flies long distances. It "is often the exemplar avian nomad in analyses movement and migration". Thus, Roshier, D., Asmus, M., from Institute of Land, Water and Society, Charles Sturt University, Australia and Klassen, M., from the Department of Plant-Animal interaction Netherlands Institute, Netherlands, led a study about the long-distance movements of grey teal in Australia. Their goal was to determine what drives these long-distance flights. They found out that 13 out of 32 long-distance movements (> 150 km (93 mi)) recorded were due to rainfall and/or flooding events that occurred up to 1,050 km (650 mi) from where the ducks initially were. Thus, it seems that water resources are a major reason in explaining the movements of grey teal. However, some birds moved to other wetlands without clear beneficial reasons. So, according to Roshier, D., Asmus, M., and Klassen, M., there are two types of movements: ranging – "a search for a place to feed or breed that should stop when the resources being sought are encountered" – and directed. Either way, "these flights occurred over distances up to 1,200 km (750 mi) across the arid inland.". Thus, grey teal disperse widely throughout the Australian continent due to adaption to environmental change such as flooding, extensive dry periods or lack of food. This process is carried out to seek their preferred environment of shallow wetlands with sufficient food supply and suitable breeding conditions. However, it is uncertain as to whether this behaviour should be referred to as 'migration' or whether a more appropriate term would be 'ranging'. The same applies in New Zealand where the species is very mobile. This flying skill implies that the local population of grey teal changes constantly, both in New Zealand and Australia, which can lead to quick changes in numbers at any locality.

Most animals and birds living within the Northern Hemisphere live in very temperate environments, therefore, cues for migration and movement involve the change in temperature or day length. However, cues for grey teal are believed to be more discrete. Although it is undetermined as to whether grey teal migrate specifically, their movement is triggered by cues such as pressure gradients that occur due to changing weather systems, low-frequency sound/temperature, and visual cues such as lack of food source. As well as this, it is believed that the grey teal uses its sense of smell to move and find suitable wetland environments. Information from tracked grey teal reveals that some flight movements were due to distant thunderstorms occurring. These thunderstorms were hundreds of kilometres away; however, due to their production of low-frequency sound, grey teal could detect this occurrence and move towards the source. Due to Australia being close to the equator, it can become very dry and hot in most places. Therefore, the use of these cues is essential for grey teal to find wetland habitats aiding their survival.

=== Survival rates and life expectancy ===
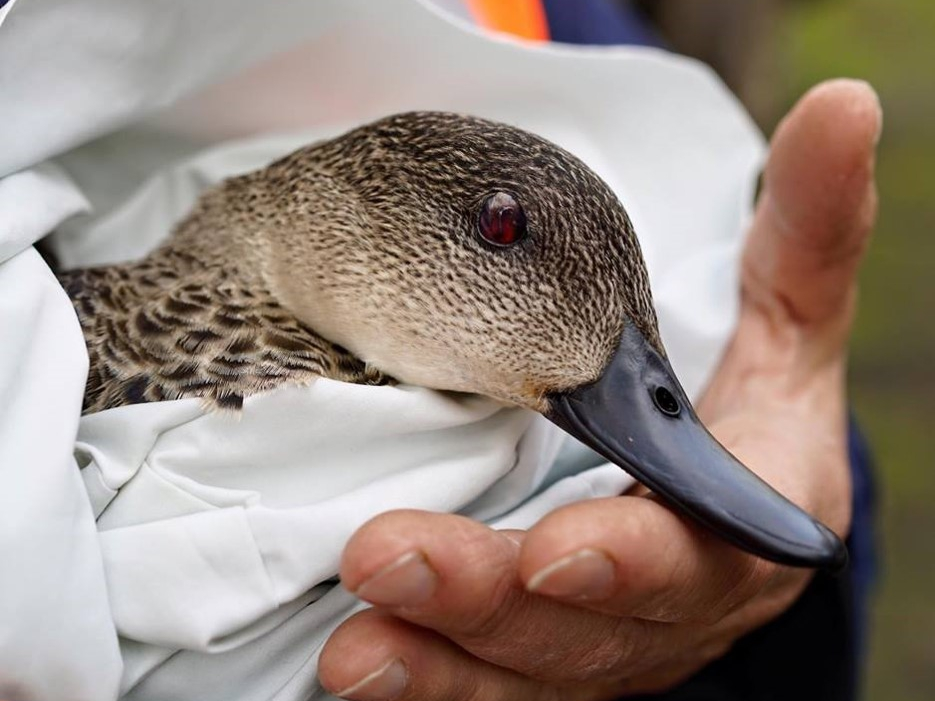
Grey teal with an eye injury from shotgun pellets at Kerang Wetlands

From a study completed by J.A. Mills on the morality and status of grey teal in New Zealand, approximate survival rates were established. To establish the rate of survival, the birds were banded. It was recorded that 68% of juveniles die within the first year of life, 77% by their first two years of life and then 85% by the end of their fourth year. Thus resulting in approximately 0.96 years of expected life for juveniles after they have been banded (age of 2–4 months). For grey teal that survive to one year of age, they are expected to have a further 2.9 years of life. For adults, the mean average was 50% of deaths annually, whereas for juveniles it was 68%. Similar results were shown in an Australian study where the mean average of deaths for adults was 52%, and for juveniles 66%. Therefore from the data collected, it can be assumed that the grey teal has an approximate life expectancy of between 2–4 years old. However, some exceptions occurred since the oldest adult recorded in the wild in New Zealand was 9 years old. It was 21 years old in Australia.

=== Diet and foraging ===
The grey teal has a diet mostly consisting of invertebrates from their habitat; these include larva of midges, water beetles, mosquitoes and caddisflies, as well as seeds from aquatic plants present in their habitat. Diet changes according to the locality and time of the year. Thus, in Australia grey teal feed mostly on plant material and especially seeds. It constitutes 87–97% of their diet. Although insects are eaten throughout the year, their part in the diet increases in spring. Similarly, molluscs and crustaceans are important in the diet only during spring and autumn. In Australia, the youngest ducklings feed only on insects but the relative amount decreases to only 30% when they are four weeks old.

Grey teal will regularly retrieve their food through the process of either dredging out estuary mudflats or exposed margins of lakeside to filter out food. Dabbling and upending in shallow water areas is another technique used for food retrieval, to collect invertebrates from just below the water surface. To obtain seeds, grey teal will strip them from the aquatic vegetation. During breeding season grey teal will feed strictly in breeding pairs or family parties; however, once the breeding season is over they tend to feed as a flock. In terms of ducklings, they must forage for their own food as there is no feeding from parents that occurs. Grey teal will feed at both morning and night time.

=== Predators, parasites, and diseases ===
Predators, parasites and disease is an area that has not been particularly well studied in grey teal. However, in Australia, they are considered a game bird due to large population numbers. Therefore hunters and duck shooters are a significant predator of these birds; whereas in New Zealand the grey teal is a protected species. This means that it cannot be hunted for due to low population numbers.

Grey teal ducklings tend to be at higher risk of predation than adults. Other aviator predators pose a threat as they are known to take ducklings out of nests from approaching above. When in the water ducklings are at risk from eels, rats and swamp harriers as they have been known to predate when the ducklings are swimming. Additionally, when adult grey teal are with broods they are at risk to predators such as ferrets and stoats.

A known parasite affecting waterfowl is Sarcocystis, also known as rice breast disease that is caused by a parasitic protozoan. Although this disease usually is asymptomatic (infected but shows no symptoms) if severe the infection can result in weakness, lameness and loss of muscle tissue. With these severe effects, this can increase the likelihood of predation on the infected species, thus increasing its chance of death. No specific cases of Sarcocystis have been found in grey teal; however, it is known that this parasite targets birds and more specifically waterfowl.

The grey teal is one of three ducks known to host the virus Dalvirus anatis.

== Relationship with humans ==
=== Game season and conservation status ===
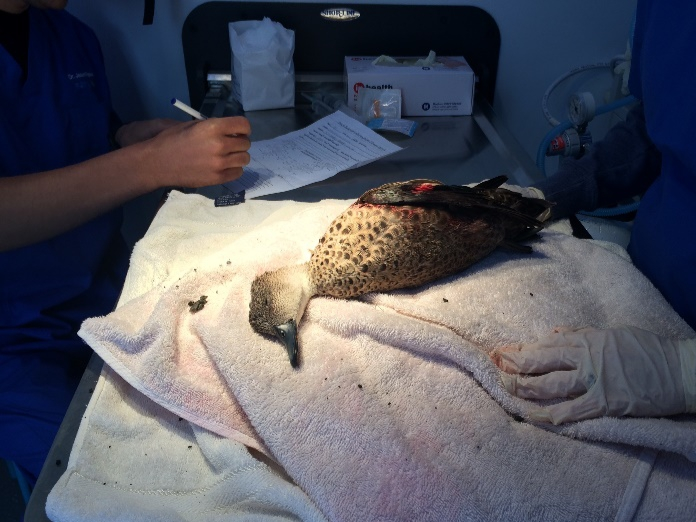
Grey teal shot at Lake Burrumbeet is given emergency care.

The grey teal, Anas gracilis, is fully protected in New Zealand. The population was estimated at 20,000 birds in 1976 and has increased to 50,000 in 2005. In 2014 there were about 120,000 grey teal in New Zealand and over 1 million in the world. Considering that now the grey teal is a common bird in the island, the government considered adding the duck to the game bird list when the Wildlife Act was reviewed in 2010. However it did not occur and the bird kept its conservation status. According to John Dyer, northern Wildlife Manager, Auckland Waikato Fish and Game Council, this decision caused some troubles between the Department of Conservation and the hunters that felt "misled for decades". Indeed, along with the conservation status come penalties if one kills the bird. Yet, it is difficult for hunters not to shoot grey teal as it is numerous and often be seen flying among huge flocks of game ducks. At least 6% of the grey teal population is shot during the hunting season.

On the contrary, in Australia the grey teal is one of the most common birds shot during the hunting season. For instance, in 2014, in the state of Victoria the hunting season lasted 3 months – while it only lasts 5 weeks in New Zealand – and hunters could shoot up to 10 grey teal daily. A survey conducted in Victoria on hunting grey teal revealed a significant number of injured birds. Some of these birds survive, while others suffer before eventually dying. Approximately 26% of the shot grey teal are either wounded or mutilated. Of these, 12% will be wounded and survive, whereas between 14% and 33% will be mutilated.
