= Realm (virology) =

Taxonomic rank

Virus classification

In virology, realm is the highest taxonomic rank established for viruses by the International Committee on Taxonomy of Viruses (ICTV), which oversees virus taxonomy. Ten virus realms are recognized and united by specific highly conserved traits:

- Adnaviria, which contains archaeal filamentous viruses with A-form double-stranded (ds) DNA genomes encoding a unique alpha-helical major capsid protein;
- Duplodnaviria, which contains all dsDNA viruses that encode the HK97-fold major capsid protein;
- Efunaviria, from the sixth Latin letter “ef” and the Latin una, meaning “one”, referring to Enterobacteria phage f1, which encodes the hallmark morphogenic module of this realm;
- Floreoviria, which contains all single-stranded DNA (ssDNA) viruses that encode an HUH superfamily endonuclease and their descendants;
- Pleomoviria, a reference to the pleomorphic morphology of viruses in this realm;
- Riboviria, which contains all RNA viruses that encode RNA-dependent RNA polymerase and all viruses that encode reverse transcriptase;
- Ribozyviria, which contains hepatitis delta virus-like viruses with circular, negative-sense ssRNA genomes;
- Singelaviria, which contains all DNA viruses that have two major capsid proteins (MCPs) that both have a single jelly roll (SJR) fold;
- Varidnaviria, which contains all dsDNA viruses that encode a vertical jelly roll major capsid protein;
- Volvereviria, from the Latin volvere, meaning “to roll”, referring to the rolling circle replication uniformly used by viruses in this realm.

The rank of realm corresponds to the rank of domain used for cellular life, but differs in that viruses in a realm do not necessarily share a common ancestor based on common descent nor do the realms share a common ancestor. Instead, realms group viruses together based on specific traits that are highly conserved over time, which may have been obtained on a single occasion or multiple occasions. As such, each realm represents at least one instance of viruses coming into existence. While historically it was difficult to determine deep evolutionary relations between viruses, in the 21st century methods such as metagenomics and cryogenic electron microscopy have enabled such research to occur, which led to the establishment of Riboviria in 2018, three realms in 2019, and two in 2020.

== Naming ==
The names of realms consist of a descriptive first part and the suffix -viria, which is the suffix used for virus realms. The first part of Duplodnaviria means "double DNA", referring to dsDNA viruses, the first part of Monodnaviria means "single DNA", referring to ssDNA viruses, the first part of Riboviria is taken from ribonucleic acid (RNA), and the first part of Varidnaviria means "various DNA". For viroids, the suffix is designated as -viroidia, and for satellites, the suffix is -satellitia, but as of 2019 neither viroid nor satellite realms have been designated.

== Realms ==
=== Duplodnaviria ===
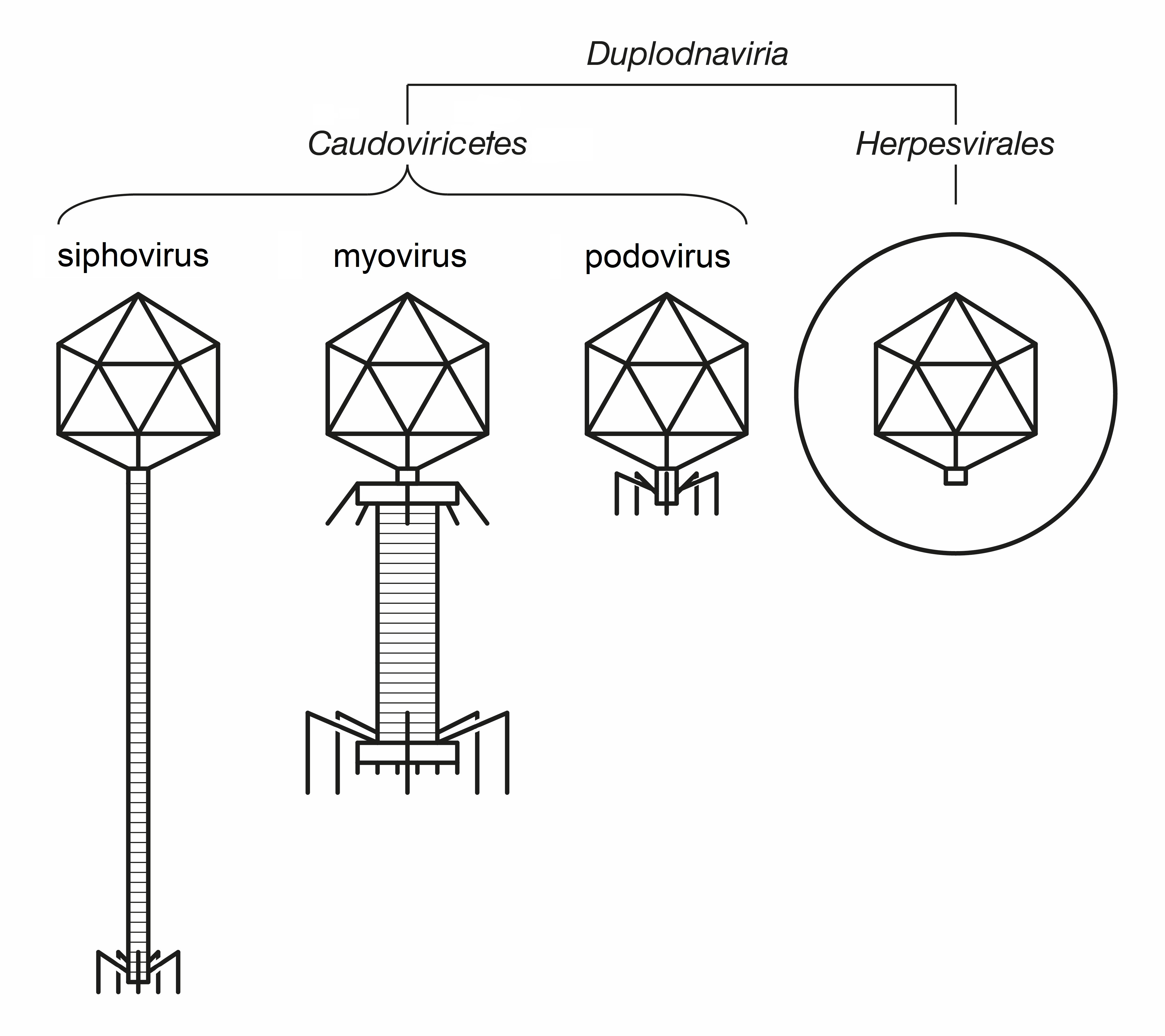
Illustrated sample of Duplodnaviria virions

Duplodnaviria contains double-stranded DNA (dsDNA) viruses that encode a major capsid protein (MCP) that has the HK97 fold. Viruses in the realm also share a number of other characteristics involving the capsid and capsid assembly, including an icosahedral capsid shape and a terminase enzyme that packages viral DNA into the capsid during assembly. Two groups of viruses are included in the realm: tailed bacteriophages, which infect prokaryotes and are assigned to the order Caudovirales, and herpesviruses, which infect animals and are assigned to the order Herpesvirales.

The relation between caudoviruses and herpesviruses is not certain, as they may either share a common ancestor or herpesviruses may be a divergent clade from within Caudovirales. A common trait among duplodnaviruses is that they cause latent infections without replication while still being able to replicate in the future. Tailed bacteriophages are ubiquitous worldwide, important in marine ecology, and the subject of much research. Herpesviruses are known to cause a variety of epithelial diseases, including herpes simplex, chickenpox and shingles, and Kaposi's sarcoma.

=== Monodnaviria ===
Monodnaviria contains single-stranded DNA (ssDNA) viruses that encode an endonuclease of the HUH superfamily that initiates rolling circle replication and all other viruses descended from such viruses. The prototypical members of the realm are called CRESS-DNA viruses and have circular ssDNA genomes. ssDNA viruses with linear genomes are descended from them, and in turn some dsDNA viruses with circular genomes are descended from linear ssDNA viruses.

CRESS-DNA viruses include three kingdoms that infect prokaryotes: Loebvirae, Sangervirae, and Trapavirae. The kingdom Shotokuvirae contains eukaryotic CRESS-DNA viruses and the atypical members of Monodnaviria. Eukaryotic monodnaviruses are associated with many diseases, and they include papillomaviruses and polyomaviruses, which cause many cancers, and geminiviruses, which infect many economically important crops.

=== Riboviria ===
Riboviria contains all RNA viruses that encode an RNA-dependent RNA polymerase (RdRp), assigned to the kingdom Orthornavirae, and all reverse transcribing viruses, i.e. all viruses that encode a reverse transcriptase (RT), assigned to the kingdom Pararnavirae. These enzymes are vital in the viral life cycle, as RdRp transcribes viral mRNA and replicates the genome, and RT likewise replicates the genome. Riboviria mostly contains eukaryotic viruses, and most eukaryotic viruses, including most human, animal, and plant viruses, belong to the realm.

Most widely known viral diseases are caused by viruses in Riboviria, which includes influenza viruses, HIV, coronaviruses, ebolaviruses, and the rabies virus, as well as the first virus to be discovered, Tobacco mosaic virus. Reverse transcribing viruses are a major source of horizontal gene transfer by means of becoming endogenized in their host's genome, and a significant portion of the human genome consists of this viral DNA.

=== Varidnaviria ===
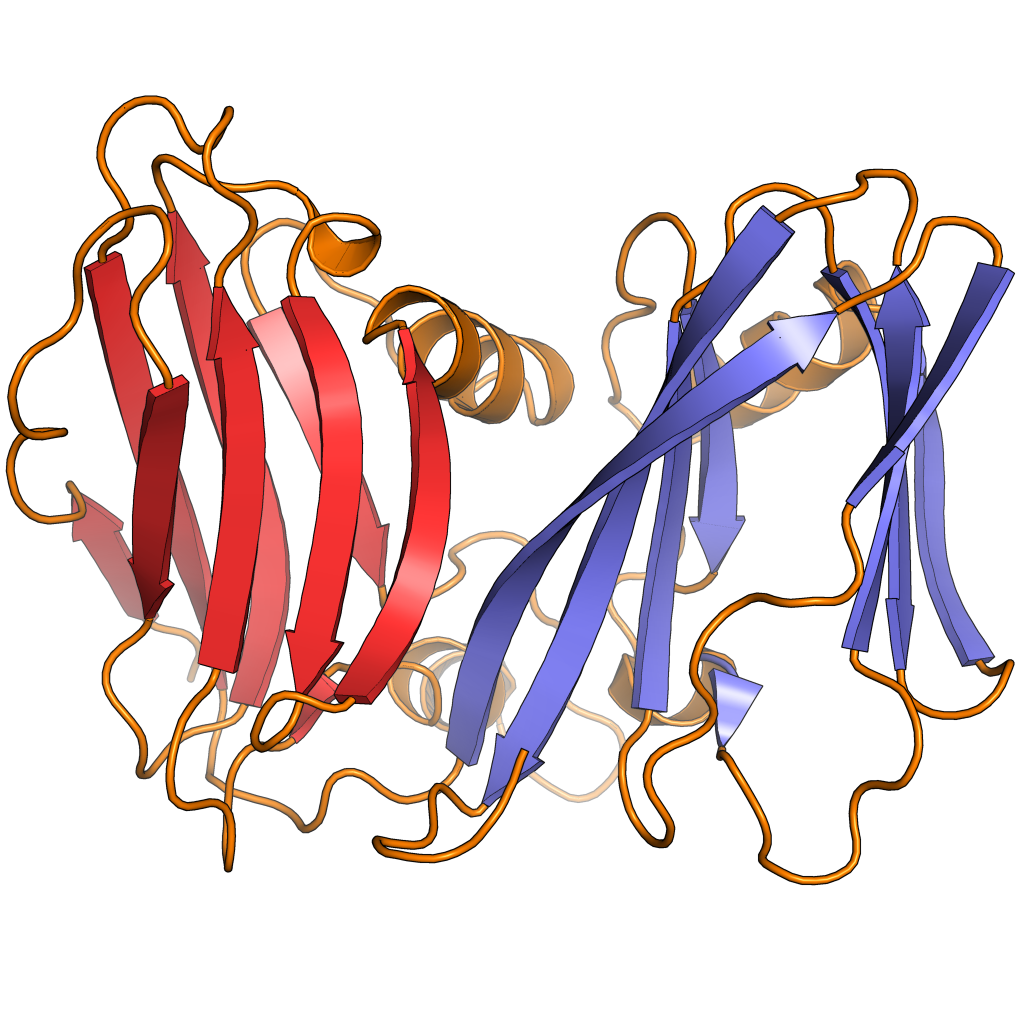
A ribbon diagram of the MCP of Pseudoalteromonas virus PM2, with the two jelly roll folds colored in red and blue

Varidnaviria contains DNA viruses that encode MCPs that have a jelly roll fold folded structure in which the jelly roll (JR) fold is perpendicular to the surface of the viral capsid. Many members also share a variety of other characteristics, including a minor capsid protein that has a single JR fold, an ATPase that packages the genome during capsid assembly, and a common DNA polymerase. Two kingdoms are recognized: Helvetiavirae, whose members have MCPs with a single vertical JR fold, and Bamfordvirae, whose members have MCPs with two vertical JR folds.

Marine viruses in Varidnaviria are ubiquitous worldwide and, like tailed bacteriophages, play an important role in marine ecology. Most identified eukaryotic DNA viruses belong to the realm. Notable disease-causing viruses in Varidnaviria include adenoviruses, poxviruses, and the African swine fever virus. Poxviruses have been highly prominent in the history of modern medicine, especially Variola virus, which caused smallpox. Many varidnaviruses are able to become endogenized, and a peculiar example of this are virophages, which confer protection for their hosts against giant viruses during infection.

=== Adnaviria ===
Realm Adnaviria unifies archaeal filamentous viruses with linear A-form double-stranded DNA genomes and characteristic major capsid proteins unrelated to those encoded by other known viruses. The realm currently includes viruses from three families, Lipothrixviridae, Rudiviridae, and Tristromaviridae, all infecting hyperthermophilic archaea. The nucleoprotein helix of adnaviruses is composed of asymmetric units containing two MCP molecules, a homodimer in the case of rudivirids and a heterodimer of paralogous MCPs in the case of lipothrixvirids and tristromavirids. The MCPs of ligamenviral particles have a unique α-helical fold first found in the MCP of rudivirid Sulfolobus islandicus rod-shaped virus 2 (SIRV2). All members of the Adnaviria share a characteristic feature in that the interaction between the MCP dimer and the linear dsDNA genome maintains the DNA in the A form. Consequently, the entire genome adopts the A form in virions. Like many structurally related viruses in the two other realms of dsDNA viruses (Duplodnaviria and Varidnaviria), there is no detectable sequence similarity among the capsid proteins of viruses from different tokiviricete families, suggesting a vast undescribed diversity of viruses in this part of the virosphere.

=== Ribozyviria ===
Ribozyviria is characterised by the presence of genomic and antigenomic ribozymes of the Deltavirus type. Additional common features include a rod-like structure and a RNA-binding "delta antigen" encoded in the genome.

== Origins ==
In general, virus realms have no genetic relation to each other based on common descent, in contrast to the three domains of cellular life—Archaea, Bacteria, and Eukarya—which share a common ancestor. Likewise, viruses within each realm are not necessarily descended from a common ancestor since realms group viruses together based on highly conserved traits, not common ancestry, which is used as the basis for the taxonomy of cellular life. As such, each virus realm is considered to represent at least one instance of viruses coming into existence. By realm:

- Adnaviria is of unknown origin, but it has been suggested that viruses of Adnaviria have potentially existed for a long time, as it is thought that they may have infected the last archaeal common ancestor.
- Duplodnaviria is either monophyletic or polyphyletic and may predate the last universal common ancestor (LUCA) of cellular life. The exact origin of the realm is not known, but the HK97-fold MCP encoded by all members is, outside the realm, only found in encapsulins, a type of nanocompartment found in bacteria, although the relation between Duplodnaviria, and encapsulins is not fully understood.
- Monodnaviria is polyphyletic and appears to have emerged multiple times from bacterial and archaeal circular plasmids, which are extra-chromosomal DNA molecules that live inside of bacteria and archaea and which self-replicate.
- Riboviria is monophyletic or polyphyletic. The reverse transcriptase of kingdom Pararnavirae likely evolved on a single occasion from a retrotransposon, a type of self-replicating DNA molecule that replicates via reverse transcription. The origin of the RdRp of Orthornavirae is less certain, but they are believed to originate from a bacterial group II intron that encodes reverse transcriptase or to predate the LUCA being descendants of the ancient RNA world and precede reverse transcriptases of cellular life. A larger study (2022) where new lineages (phyla) were described, was in favor of the hypothesis that RNA viruses descend from the RNA world, suggesting that retroelements of cellular life originated from an ancestor related to the phylum Lenarviricota and that members of a newly discovered Taraviricota lineage (phylum) would be the ancestors of all RNA viruses.
- Ribozyviria is of unknown origin. It has been proposed that they may have derived from retrozymes (a family of retrotransposons) or a viroid-like element (i.e. viroids and satellites) with capsid protein capture.
- Varidnaviria is either monophyletic or polyphyletic and may predate the LUCA. The kingdom Bamfordvirae is likely derived from the other kingdom Helvetiavirae via fusion of two MCPs to have an MCP with two jelly roll folds instead of one. The single jelly roll (SJR) fold MCPs of Helvetiavirae show a relation to a group of proteins that contain SJR folds, including the Cupin superfamily and nucleoplasmins. Archaeal dsDNA viruses in Portogloboviridae contain just one vertical SJR-MCP, which appears to have been duplicated to two for Halopanivirales, so the MCP of Portogloboviridae likely represents an earlier stage in the evolutionary history of Varidnaviria MCPs. However, another scenario was later proposed in which the Bamfordvirae and Helvetiavirae kingdoms would originate independently suggesting that the Bamfordvirae DJR-MCP protein snow a relation with the bacterial DUF 2961 protein, leading to a revision of the realm Varidnaviria. It is possible that the Bamfordvirae DJR-MCP will evolve from this protein independently, however the origin of the DJR-MCP by duplication of the Helvetiavirae SJR-MCP cannot yet be ruled out. A molecular phylogenetic analysis suggests that Helvetiavirae had no involvement in the origin of the Bamfordvirae DJR-MCP and that they probably derive from the class Tectiliviricetes.

While the realms generally have no genetic relation to each other, there are some exceptions:

- Viruses in the family Podoviridae in Duplodnaviria encode a DNA polymerase that is related to the DNA polymerases encoded by many members of Varidnaviria.
- Eukaryotic viruses in the kingdom Shotokuvirae in Monodnaviria were created on multiple occasions by recombination events that combined the DNA of ancestral plasmids with complementary DNA (cDNA) of positive sense RNA viruses in Riboviria, by which ssDNA viruses in Shotokuvirae obtained capsid proteins from RNA viruses.
- The family Bidnaviridae in Monodnaviria was created via integration of a parvovirus (of Monodnaviria) genome into a polinton, a virus-like self-replicating DNA molecule, which are related to viruses in Varidnaviria. Furthermore, bidnaviruses encode a receptor-binding protein inherited from reoviruses in the realm Riboviria.

== Subrealm ==
In virology, the second highest taxonomy rank established by the ICTV is subrealm, which is the rank below realm. Subrealms of viruses use the suffix -vira, viroid subrealms use the suffix -viroida, and satellites use the suffix -satellitida. The rank below subrealm is kingdom. As of 2019, no taxa are described at the rank of subrealm.

== History ==
Prior to the 21st century, it was believed that deep evolutionary relations between viruses could not be discovered due to their high mutation rates and small number of genes making discovering these relations more difficult. Because of this, the highest taxonomic rank for viruses from 1991 to 2017 was order. In the 21st century, however, various methods have been developed that have enabled these deeper evolutionary relationships to be studied, including metagenomics, which has identified many previously undiscovered viruses, and comparison of highly conserved traits, leading to the desire to establish higher-level taxonomy for viruses.

In two votes in 2018 and 2019, the ICTV agreed to adopt a 15-rank classification system for viruses, ranging from realm to species. Riboviria was established in 2018 based on phylogenetic analysis of the RNA-dependent polymerases being monophyletic, Duplodnaviria was established in 2019 based on increasing evidence that tailed bacteriophages and herpesviruses shared many traits, Monodnaviria was established in 2019 after the relation and origin of CRESS-DNA viruses was resolved, and Varidnaviria was established 2019 based on the shared characteristics of member viruses.

== See also ==
- Virus classification
