= List of subviral agents =

Pathogenic entities

Subviral agents are pathogenic entities that can cause disease, but lack various fundamental properties of viruses. Subviral agents consist of satellites, viroids, prions, defective interfering particles, viriforms, and, most recently, obelisks.

Species	Classification
Maize white line mosaic satellite virus	Satellite - RNA
Panicum mosaic satellite virus	Satellite - RNA
Tobacco mosaic satellite virus	Satellite - RNA
Tobacco necrosis satellite virus	Satellite - RNA
Macrobrachium satellite virus 1	Satellite - RNA
Nilaparvata lugens commensal X virus	Satellite - RNA
Chronic bee-paralysis satellite virus	Satellite - RNA
Cafeteriavirus-dependent mavirus	Satellite - DNA
Mimivirus-dependent virus Sputnik	Satellite - DNA
Mimivirus-dependent virus Zamilon	Satellite - DNA
Phaeocystis globosa virus virophage	Satellite - DNA
Chlorella virophage	Satellite - DNA
Dishui lake virophage	Satellite - DNA
Guarani virophage	Satellite - DNA
Organic Lake virophage	Satellite - DNA
Qinghai Lake virophage	Satellite - DNA
Yellowstone Lake virophage	Satellite - DNA
Alphasatellite (Family)	Satellite - DNA
Tolecusatellitidae (Family)	Satellite - DNA
Virusoids (Family)	Satellite - RNA - Uncapsulated
Defective interfering particle	Defective interfering particle
Avocado sunblotch viroid	Viroid
Peach latent mosaic viroid	Viroid
Eggplant latent viroid	Viroid
Potato spindle tuber viroid	Viroid
Hop stunt viroid	Viroid
Coconut cadang-cadang viroid	Viroid
Apple scar skin viroid	Viroid
Coleus blumei viroid 1	Viroid
Polydnaviriformidae	Viriform
Rhodogtaviriformidae	Viriform
Bartogtaviriformidae,	Viriform
Brachygtaviriformida	Viriform
Obelisks	Obelisk
Prions	Prion

== See also ==
- Transmissible spongiform encephalopathy
- Virus classification
