= Phaeocystis globosa virus virophage =

Virus classification
- (unranked): Virus
- Realm: Varidnaviria
- Kingdom: Bamfordvirae
- Phylum: Preplasmiviricota
- Virus: Phaeocystis globosa virus virophage

Species of virus

Phaeocystis globosa virus virophage, or PgVV, or Preplasmiviricota sp. Gezel-14T, is a polinton-like virus, which are small DNA viruses that are found integrated in protist genomes. Similar to virophages, PgVV requires a helper virus to replicate. Phaeocystis globosa virus virophage has a parasitic relationship with its helper virus species Phaeocystis globosa virus (PgV). They are a species of giant virus that infect algae of the genus Phaeocystis.
