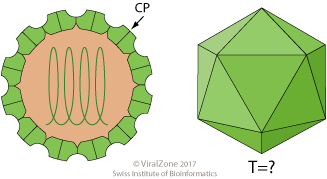

Virus classification
- (unranked): Virus
- Realm: Riboviria
- Family: Tonesaviridae
- Genus: Aumaivirus
- Species: Maize aumaivirus 1

= Maize white line mosaic satellite virus =

Species of virus

Maize white line mosaic satellite virus (syn. Satellite maize white line mosaic virus, Satellite virus of maize white line mosaic virus, SMWLMV, SV-MWLMV) is a plant satellite virus. It is the only species in genus Aumaivirus, which is a member of realm Riboviria without assigned family or order. It only infects maize which is infected by Maize white line mosaic virus (MWLMV) of genus Aureusvirus.

== Etymology ==
The genus name, Aumaivirus, is a combination of Aureusvirus (the name of the helper virus) and maize, the host plant of the only species of the genus.

== Virology ==
Trivial genome map of genus Aumaivirus

SMWLMV has a genome consisting of linear single-stranded RNA of positive polarity. It has a length of 1,168 nucleotides and consists of a single gene that encodes a capsid protein (CP). It neither has a poly(A) tail nor a cap structure. As in satellite tobacco necrosis virus (STNV), the SMWLMV virion is 17 nm in diameter, but the capsid protein has limited sequence homology with the corresponding proteins of STNV viruses.

== See also ==
- List of subviral agents
