= Antonius Suwanto =

Indonesian biologist and professor

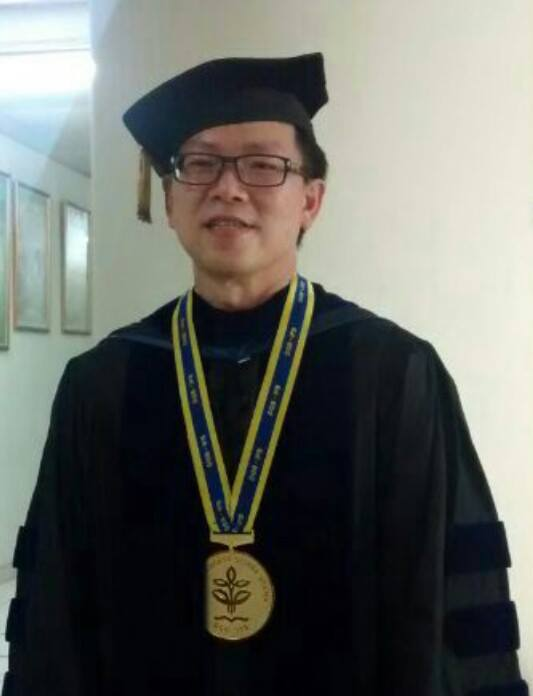
Penobatan Guru Besar di Institut Pertanian Bogor

Antonius Suwanto, (born November 30, 1959) is an Indonesian biologist and professor, known for discovering two circular chromosomes or plasmids in Rhodobacter with Kaplan S in 1989.

He was born in Jember, Indonesia. He received an award as cum laude from the Institut Pertanian Bogor, Indonesia. After that he received his master's degree from the University of Illinois. He is a faculty member in the Department of Biology, Institut Pertanian Bogor.

== Publications ==
- Suwanto, A; Kaplan, S (1989). "Physical and genetic mapping of the Rhodobacter sphaeroides 2.4.1 genome: Presence of two unique circular chromosomes". Journal of Bacteriology. 171 (11): 5850–9. doi:10.1128/jb.171.11.5850-5859.1989. PMC 210445. PMID 2808300.
- Suwanto, A; Kaplan, S (1989). "Physical and genetic mapping of the Rhodobacter sphaeroides 2.4.1 genome: Genome size, fragment identification, and gene localization". Journal of Bacteriology. 171 (11): 5840–9. doi:10.1128/jb.171.11.5840-5849.1989. PMC 210444. PMID 2553662.
- Suwanto, A; Kaplan, S (1992). "Chromosome transfer in Rhodobacter sphaeroides: Hfr formation and genetic evidence for two unique circular chromosomes". Journal of Bacteriology. 174 (4): 1135–45. doi:10.1128/jb.174.4.1135-1145.1992. PMC 206406. PMID 1735708.
- Suwanto, A; Kaplan, S (1992). "A self-transmissible, narrow-host-range endogenous plasmid of Rhodobacter sphaeroides 2.4.1: Physical structure, incompatibility determinants, origin of replication, and transfer functions". Journal of Bacteriology. 174 (4): 1124–34. doi:10.1128/jb.174.4.1124-1134.1992. PMC 206405. PMID 1735707.
- Teo, J. W.; Suwanto, A; Poh, C. L. (2000). "Novel beta-lactamase genes from two environmental isolates of Vibrio harveyi". Antimicrobial Agents and Chemotherapy. 44 (5): 1309–14. doi:10.1128/aac.44.5.1309-1314.2000. PMC 89860. PMID 10770767.
- Kwong, S. M.; Yeo, C. C.; Suwanto, A; Poh, C. L. (2000). "Characterization of the endogenous plasmid from Pseudomonas alcaligenes NCIB 9867: DNA sequence and mechanism of transfer". Journal of Bacteriology. 182 (1): 81–90. doi:10.1128/jb.182.1.81-90.2000. PMC 94243. PMID 10613866.
- Rukayadi, Y; Suwanto, A; Tjahjono, B; Harling, R (2000). "Survival and epiphytic fitness of a nonpathogenic mutant of Xanthomonas campestris pv. Glycines". Applied and Environmental Microbiology. 66 (3): 1183–9. Bibcode:2000ApEnM..66.1183R. doi:10.1128/aem.66.3.1183-1189.2000. PMC 91960. PMID 10698789.
- Barus, T.; Suwanto, A.; Wahyudi, A. T.; Wijaya, Hanny (2008). "Role of Bacteria in Tempe Bitter Taste Formation: Microbiological and Molecular Biological Analysis Based on 16S rRNA Gene". Microbiology Indonesia. 2 (1): 17–21. doi:10.5454/mi.2.1.4. ISSN 1978-3477.
- Seumahu, C. A.; Suwanto, A.; Rusmana, I.; Solihin, D. D. (2012). "Comparison of DNA Extraction Methods for Microbial Community Analysis in Indonesian Tempe Employing Amplified Ribosomal Intergenic Spacer Analysis". HAYATI Journal of Biosciences. 19 (2): 93–98. doi:10.4308/hjb.19.2.93. ISSN 1978-3019.
- Barus, T.; Hanjaya, I.; Sadeli, J.; Lay, B. W.; Suwanto, A.; Yulandi, A. (2013). "Genetic Diversity of Klebsiella spp. Isolated from Tempe based on Enterobacterial Repetitive Intergenic Consensus-Polymerase Chain Reaction (ERIC-PCR)". HAYATI Journal of Biosciences. 20 (4): 171–176. doi:10.4308/hjb.20.4.171. ISSN 1978-3019.
