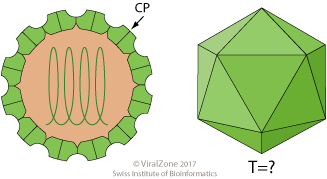

Virus classification
- (unranked): Virus
- Realm: Riboviria
- Family: Tonesaviridae
- Genus: Albetovirus

Species
- Tobacco albetovirus 1; Tobacco albetovirus 2; Tobacco albetovirus 3

= Albetovirus =

Genus of virus

Albetovirus is a plant satellite virus genus. As a member of realm Riboviria without assigned family or order it contains just three species, Tobacco albetovirus 1, 2, and 3 (alias Satellite tobacco necrosis virus 1, 2, respectively C). The three virus species included in this genus represent satellite viruses that depend for their replication on helper viruses of the genera Alphanecrovirus or Betanecrovirus (prior to 2011 together referred to as Necrovirus, family Tombusviridae)

These satellite viruses may not be confused with Satellite tobacco mosaic virus, which is also known as Satellite tobacco necrosis virus (just that), member of genus Virtovirus.

== Etymology ==
The genus name, Albetovirus, is a combination of Al, for Alphanecrovirus, be, for Betanecrovirus, and to for tobacco..

== Virology ==
Trivial genome map of genus Albetovirus

Viruses of genus Albetovirus have a genome consisting of linear single-stranded RNA of positive polarity, similar in size (1221 to 1245 nucleotides long), which has a single gene. This codes for a single protein which is the capsid protein. The virions are non-enveloped, paraspherical in shape with icosahedral symmetry and 17 nm in diameter.
