= Helper dependent virus =

Synthetic viral vector

A helper dependent virus, also termed a gutless virus, is a synthetic viral vector dependent on the assistance of a helper virus in order to replicate, and can be used for purposes such as gene therapy. Naturally occurring satellite viruses are also helper virus dependent, and can sometimes be modified to become viral vectors.

== Viral vector ==
Since the genome of the gutless virus does not include genes encoding the enzymes and/or structural proteins required to replicate, it is deemed safe for use in gene therapy since an infection cannot occur except in the presence of a suitable helper virus.

Well established protocols allow scientists to propagate helper dependent viruses in the lab. However, using an actual helper virus poses problems when it comes to purification of a desired transgenic virus. Therefore, lab methods often utilize minimal fragments of the helper DNA that can serve this purpose without creating unwanted virus. This process usually involves the introduction of three separate DNA plasmids into a eukaryotic cell line through a process called transfection. These plasmids contain either transgenic DNA or replication and capsid encoding DNA, plus helper DNA. Every cell that is successfully transfected with all three DNA fragments will produce the necessary proteins to produce infective viruses. These viruses will only have transgenic DNA encapsidated and therefore once they've infected a patient's cell, they will not be capable of reproducing.

== Satellite virus ==
Helper dependent viruses can also occur in nature without being "gutted". The term satellite virus has been given to a large group of viruses that all require the presence of another virus to replicate. Many of these are plant viruses, but animal viruses can be seen in the case of dependoviruses.

Within the family parvoviridae, the dependovirus genus was given a distinct classification due to their dependence on another virus. The most widely known dependovirus is adeno-associated virus (AAV) which was originally discovered as a contaminant in a sample of simian adenovirus. Though AAV is considered to be dependent on adenovirus, it is able to replicate in the presence of herpesvirus as well as certain cytotoxic events such as UV irradiation or some carcinogens During the course of a natural dependovirus infection, if the helper virus is not present, the dependovirus is often capable of integrating into the host genome and going into a latent phase of its life cycle—effectively waiting for the next helper virus infection. For gene therapy uses, the vector is stripped of its ability to integrate. Because AAV can deliver transgenic material in a non-replicating form, it is a strong candidate for gene therapy and is currently used in about 8% of clinical trials.

Hepatitis D virus (HDV) is an example of a replication defective, helper dependent ssRNA virus because it requires Hepatitis B virus (HBV) to provide HBV surface antigen (HBsAg) for the encapsidation of its genome. The envelope proteins on the outer surface of HDV are entirely provided by HBV.
