= Virusoid =

Circular satellite RNAs

Virus classification
- Informal group: Subviral agents
- Informal group: Satellite nucleic acids
- Informal group: Circular satellite RNAs

Circular single-stranded RNA(s) dependent on viruses for replication

Virusoids are circular single-stranded RNA(s) dependent on viruses for replication and encapsidation. The genome of virusoids consists of several hundred (200–400) nucleotides and does not code for any proteins.

Virusoids are essentially viroids that have been encapsulated by a helper virus coat protein. They are thus similar to viroids in their means of replication (rolling circle replication) and in their lack of genes, but they differ in that viroids do not possess a protein coat. Both virusoids and a few viroids encode a hammerhead ribozyme.

Virusoids, while being studied in virology, are subviral particles rather than viruses. Since they depend on helper viruses, they are classified as satellite nucleic acids. Virusoids are listed in virological taxonomy as Satellites/Satellite nucleic acids/Subgroup 3: Circular satellite RNA(s).

== Definition ==
Depending on whether a lax or strict definition is used, the term virusoid may also include Hepatitis D virus (HDV). Like plant virusoids, HDV is circular, single-stranded, and supported by a helper virus (Hepatitis B virus) to form virions; however, the virions possess a much larger genome size (~1700 nt) and encode a protein. They also show no sequence similarity with the plant virusoid group.

== History ==
The first virusoid was discovered in Nicotiana velutina plants infected with Velvet tobacco mottle virus R2 (VTMOV). These RNAs have also been referred to as viroid-like RNAs that can infect commercially important agricultural crops and are non–self-replicating single stranded RNAs. RNA replication of virusoids is similar to that of viroids but, unlike viroids, virusoids require specific "helper" viruses.

== Replication ==
The circular structure of virusoid RNA molecules is ideal for rolling circle replication, in which multiple copies of the genome are generated in an efficient manner from a single replication initiation event. Another advantage to circular RNAs as replication intermediates is that they are inaccessible and resistant to exonucleases. Additionally, their high GC content and high degree of self-complementarity make them very stable against endonucleases. Circular RNAs impose constraints on RNA folding by which secondary structures that are favored for replication differ from those assumed during ribozyme-mediated self-cleavage.

Plant satellite RNAs and virusoids depend on their respective helper viruses for replication, while the helper viruses themselves are dependent upon plants to provide some of the components required for replication. Therefore, a complex interaction involving all three major players including satellites, helper viruses and host plants is essential for satellite / virusoid replication.

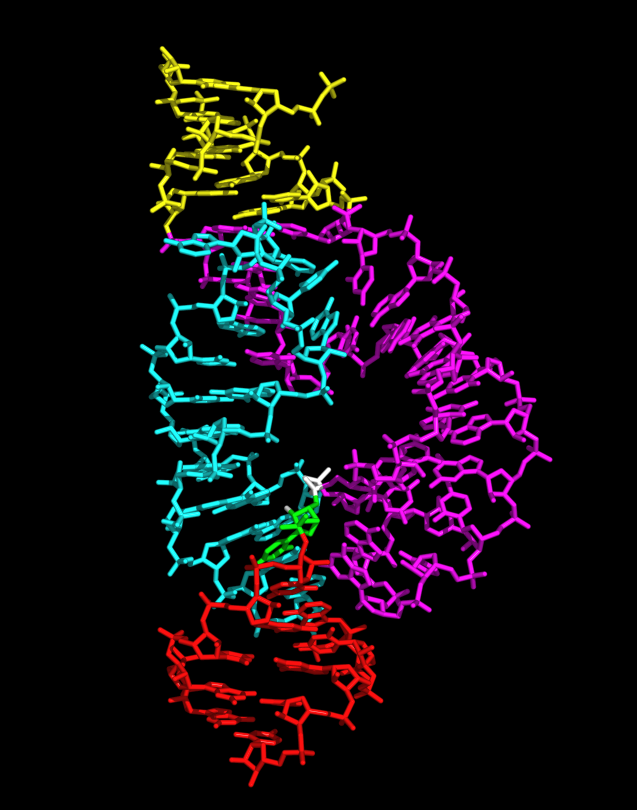
A hammerhead ribozyme, not from a virusoid (PDB: 2GOZ)

satLTSV replication has been shown to occur through the symmetric rolling circle mechanism, wherein the satLTSV self-cleaves both (+) and (-) strands. Both the (+) and (-) strands of satLTSV were found to be equally infectious. Nevertheless, since only the (+) strand is packaged in the LTSV particles, the origin of assembly sequence (OAS) / secondary structure is assumed to be present on the (+) strand only.

Gellatly et al., 2011 demonstrated that the entire satLTSV molecule possesses sequence and structural significance wherein any mutations (insertions / deletions) causing disruption in the overall rod-like structure of the virusoid molecule are lethal to its infectivity. Foreign nucleotides introduced into the molecule will only be tolerated if they preserve the overall cruciform structure of the satLTSV. Furthermore, the introduced foreign sequences are eliminated in successive generations to ultimately reproduce the wild-type satLTSV.

Therefore, in satLTSV RNA, the entire sequence seems to be essential for replication. This contrasts with satRNA of TBSV or the defective-interfering RNAs, in which only a small portion of their respective sequences / secondary structures were found to be sufficient for replication.

== Role of ribozyme structures in the self-cleavage and replication of virusoids ==
Virusoids structurally resemble the viroids as they possess native secondary structures that form double-stranded rod-like molecules with short terminal branches. They also contain hammerhead ribozymes that are involved in autocatalytic cleavage of satRNA multimers during rolling circle replication. It was proposed that the hammerhead ribozyme structure of satLTSV is formed only transiently, similar to that observed by Song & Miller (2004) with satRPV (Cereal yellow dwarf polerovirus serotype RPV) RNA. This hammerhead structure contains a short stem III that is stabilized by only two base-paired nucleotides. This unstable conformation thus suggests that a double hammerhead mode of cleavage takes place. These structures are similar to those reported for CarSV and newt ribozymes, which implies an ancient relationship between these divergent RNAs. The observation by Collins et al., 1998 that the dimer of the satRYMV RNA is more efficiently self-cleaved than the monomer is consistent with the double hammerhead mode of cleavage. The self-cleavage of the satRYMV in the (+) strand and not in the (-) strand implies that the satRYMV replicates through an asymmetric mode of rolling circle replication, similar to other sobemoviral satellites with the exception of satLTSV.

== Evolutionary origin ==
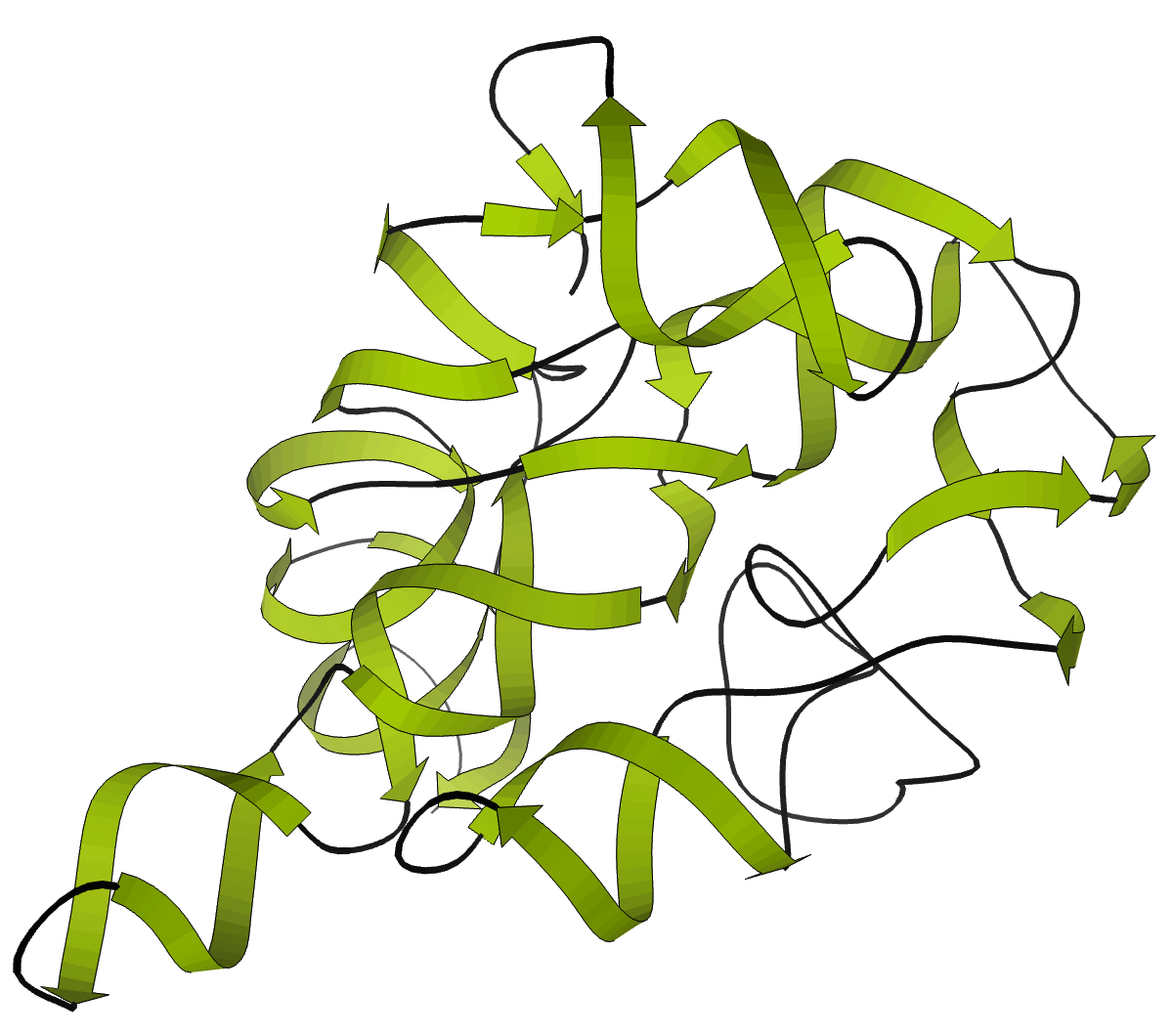
A group I intron (PDB: 1grz)

Considering properties such as their diminutive size, circular structure and the presence of hammerhead ribozymes, viroids may have had an ancient evolutionary origin distinct from that of the viruses. Likewise, the lack of any sequence similarity between the satellite RNAs and their host viruses, host plants and insect vectors implies that these satellite RNAs have had a spontaneous origin. Alternatively, the siRNAs and microRNAs generated during viral infections may have been amplified by helper virus replicases, whereby these molecules assembled to form satellite RNAs.

Virusoids and viroids have been compared to circular introns due to their size similarity. It has been proposed that virusoids and viroids originated from introns. Comparisons have been made between the (-) strand of viroids and the U1 small nuclear ribonucleoprotein particle (snRNPs), implicating that viroids could be escaped introns. Dickson (1981) also observed such homologies within both the (+) and (-) strands of viroids and virusoids. In particular, virusoids and viroids exhibit several structural and sequence homologies to the group I introns such as the self-splicing intron of Tetrahymena thermophila.

A phylogeny based on a manually-adjusted alignment in 2001 suggests that virusoids may form a clade of their own as a sister group to Avsunviroidae, which also possess hammerhead ribozymes. However, the said alignment is not available, making the results hard to reproduce.

Virusoids and other circular RNAs are ancient molecules that are being explored with renewed interest. Circular RNAs have been shown to possess a number of functions, ranging from modulation of gene expression, interactions with RNA binding proteins (RBPs) acting as miRNA sponges and have been linked to a number of human diseases, including aging and cancer.

== Developments ==
Abouhaidar et al., 2014 demonstrated the only example of protein translation and messenger RNA activity in the Rice yellow mottle virus small circular satellite RNA (scRYMV). This group suggested that the scRYMV be designated as a virusoid satelliteRNA that could serve as a model system for both translation and replication.

The most promising application of these subviral agents is to make specific vectors that can be used for the future development of biological control agents for plant viral diseases. The vector system could be applied for the overexpression and silencing of foreign genes. The unique example of a foreign expression vector is Bamboo mosaic virus satellite RNA (satBaMV), which possesses an open reading frame that encodes a 20-kDa P20 protein. It was observed that when this nonessential ORF region was replaced with a foreign gene, expression of the foreign gene was enhanced or overexpressed. In the case of gene silencing, various satellite RNA-based vectors can be used for sequence-specific inactivation. Satellite Tobacco Mosaic Virus (STMV) was the first subviral agent to be developed as a satellite virus-induced silencing system (SVISS).
