= Rhodobacter capsulatus =

Scientific classification
- Domain: Bacteria
- Kingdom: Pseudomonadati
- Phylum: Pseudomonadota
- Class: Alphaproteobacteria
- Order: Rhodobacterales
- Family: Paracoccaceae
- Genus: Rhodobacter
- Species: R. capsulatus

Binomial name
- Rhodobacter capsulatus (Molisch 1907) Imhoff et al. 1984

Type strain
- ATCC 11166, ATCC 17015, ATH 2.3.1, BCRC 16406, C10, CCRC 16406, CCTM 1913, CCUG 31484, CGMCC 1.2359, CGMCC 1.3366, CIP 104408, DSM 1710, Ewart C10, HMSATH.2.3.1, IAM 14232, IFO 16435, JCM 21090, KCTC 2583, LMG 2962, NBRC 16435, NCIB 8254, NCIMB 8254, van Niel ATH.2.3.1, van Niel ATH.2.3.1.

Synonyms
- Rhodopseudomonas capsulata

Species of bacterium

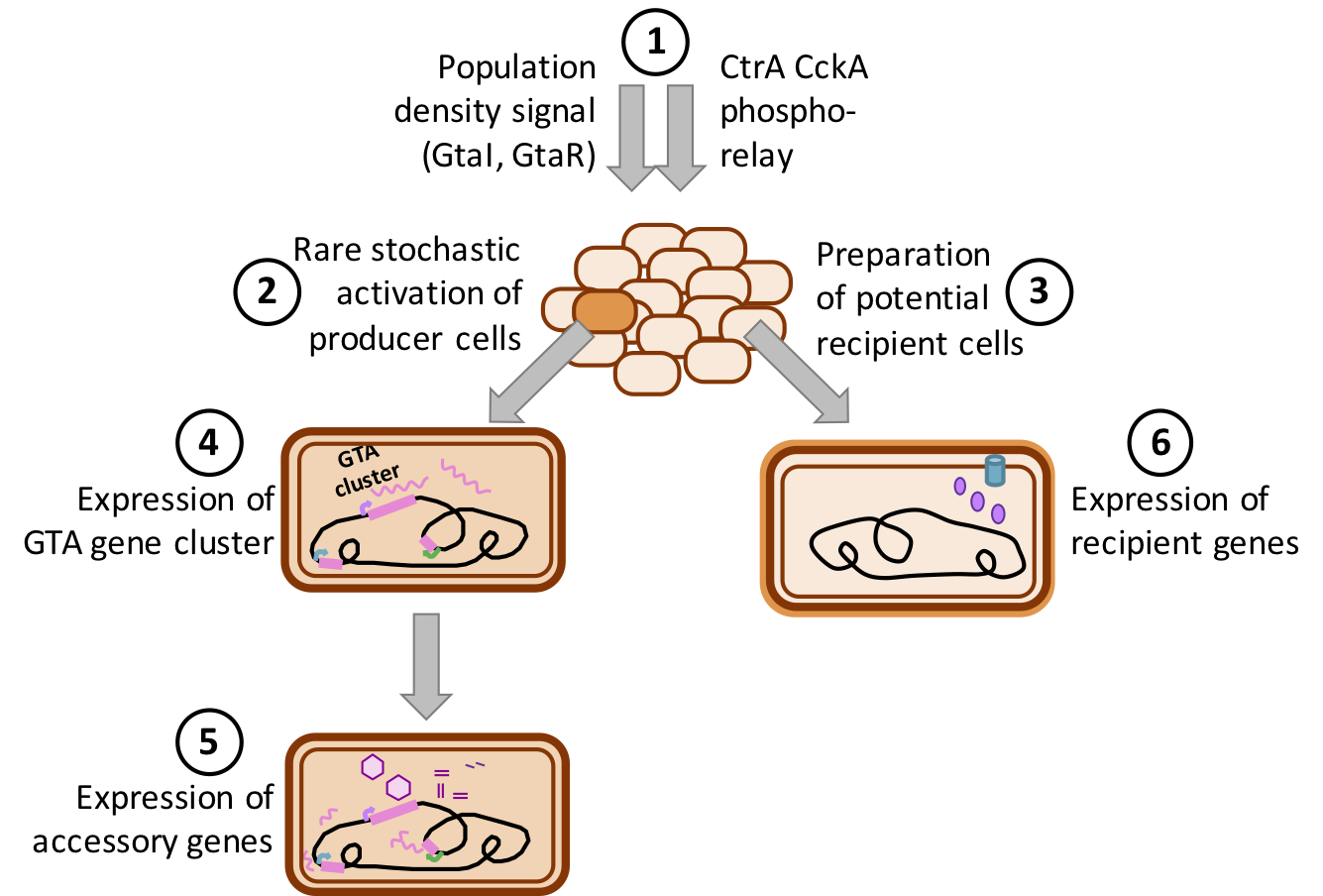
Regulation diagram for RcGTA, the Rhodobacter capsulatus Gene Transfer Agent

Rhodobacter capsulatus is a species of purple bacteria, a group of bacteria that can obtain energy through photosynthesis. Its name is derived from the Latin adjective "capsulatus" ("with a chest", "encapsulated"), itself derived Latin noun "capsula" (meaning "a small box or chest"), and the associated Latin suffix for masculine nouns, "-atus" (denoting that something is "provided with" something else).

Its complete genome has been sequenced and is available to the public.

== Discovery ==
The discoverHans Molisch, a Czech-Austrian botanist. The microorganism, then named Rhodonostoc capsulatum, was identified in 1907 in his book Die Purpurbakterien nach neuen Untersuchungen. C. B. van Niel then characterized the species further in 1944 where it was renamed Rhodopseudomonas capsulata. Van Niel initially described 16 strains of R. capsulata that he was able to culture from mud samples collected in California and Cuba. In 1984, the species would be reclassified as Rhodobacter capsulatus with the introduction of the genus Rhodobacter. This genus was introduced to better differentiate Rhodopseudomonas species with distinct morphological differences such as those with vesicular intracytoplasmic membranes (membrane-bound compartments in the cell often involved in photosynthesis) like R. capsulatus and R. sphaeroides.

== Genomic Characteristics ==
The R. capusulatus genome consists of one chromosome and one plasmid. Sanger sequencing was first used to assemble the genome. The complete genome was then analyzed using several programs, Critica, Glimmer, RNAmmer, tRNAscan, and ARAGORN. These programs all identify different groups of genes, including protein-coding, tRNA, tmRNA, and rRNA genes. The chromosome is approximately 3.7-Mb with 3,531 open reading frames (ORFs), while the plasmid is smaller at 133-kb and 154 ORFs. Within the 3,531 ORFs in the chromosome, 3,100 had a known function assigned. Another 610 ORFs had similarities to genes that are known, but their function is still not proven. The rest of the ORFs were novel, with nothing similar in UniRef90, NCBI-NR, COG, or KEGG databases used for comparison. The genetic material had a high GC content at 66.6%. R. capsulatus contains all of the genes necessary to produce all 20 amino acids, and also contains 42 transposase genes, and 237 phage genes, including the gene transfer agent (GTA). The chromosome can be found in the NCBI database under CP001312, and the plasmid is under accession number CP001313.

== Ecology ==
These bacteria prefer aqueous environments such as those around natural water sources or in sewage. R. capsulatus has been isolated from the United States and Cuba. Initially, this bacteria could be grown in the lab by plating samples from the environment onto RCVBN (DL-malic acid, ammonium sulfate, biotin, nicotinic acid, trace elements, and some additional compounds) medium and incubating them anaerobically with ample light. Colonies on these plates could then be isolated, grown in pure culture, and identified as R. capsulatus. With the sequencing of its genome, RNA and DNA sequencing can now be used to identify this species.

== Morphology and Physiological Characteristics ==
R. capsulatus is a phototrophic bacterium with some distinctive characteristics. They can grow either as rods or as motile coccobacilli, which is dependent on their environment. At pH levels below 7, the bacterium is spherical and forms chains. When the pH rises above 7, they switch to rod morphology. The length of the rod shaped bacteria is dependent on the pH as well; the cells elongate as the pH rises. In their rod shape, they also often form chains that are bent in nature. The original paper describes them as "zigzaggy" in shape. In response to the stress put on the cell at a pH of 8 or above, the cells display pleiomorphism, or abnormal, filamentous growth, and they produce a slimy substance for protection. Anaerobic culturing of the organism produces a brown color, on the spectrum of yellow-brown to burgundy. In media containing malonate, the reddish-brown, or burgundy, color is observed. When the organism is grown aerobically, a red color is produced. This species will not grow above 30 °C, and it will grow within 6 and 8.5 pH, although specific temperature and pH optima are not explicitly stated in the characterization paper. Although most Rhodobacter species are freshwater and have little salt tolerance, some strains of R. capsulatus appear to tolerate up to 0.3 M NaCl depending on their source of nitrogen.

== Metabolism ==
As a purple non-sulfur bacterium, it is capable of aerobic growth without light, or anaerobic growth with light present, as well as fermentation. This species is also capable of fixing nitrogen. For carbon sources, R. capsulatus can utilize glucose, fructose, alanine, glutamic acid, propionate, glutaric acid, and other organic acids. However, it cannot use mannitol, tartrate, citrate, gluconate, ethanol, sorbitol, mannose, and leucine, which is unique to R. capsulatus when compared to other species in the genus. The most successful enrichments of this species come from propionate and organic acids. Under photoheterotrophic conditions, R. capsulatus strain B10 is capable of using acetate as its sole carbon source, but the mechanisms of this have not been identified. The strains studied do not hydrolyze gelatin.

== Significance ==
Rhodobacter capsulatus was the first microorganism observed to produce gene transfer agents. A gene transfer agent (GTA) is a phage-like particle that transfers small amounts of DNA from the producing cell’s chromosome to aid in horizontal gene transfer. The DNA packaged in the particles is also random; it does not contain all the genes needed for GTA production. While somewhat similar to a transducing particle, GTAs are not created by accident when a phage is packaging DNA into viral particles. The genes for GTAs and their regulation are controlled by the cell itself, not a phage. These particles were first identified when researchers put several different antibiotic resistant strains of R. capsulatus in co-culture and observed doubly-resistant strains. This DNA exchange was still observed even when cell contact was eliminated and DNases were added which allowed them to rule out conjugation and transformation as the cause. A small filterable agent was soon identified as the source of this genetic exchange. When a mutant strain that over-produced these agents was created, it was proven the particles were not being produced by a phage, but by R. capsulatus. After the genes for GTA production were sequenced, more species were found to produce GTAs leading to Rhodobacter capsulatus’s gene transfer agent being abbreviated to RcGTA. It has been suggested that harsh conditions may trigger the cell to begin producing GTAs which would allow genomic DNA to be shared and increase the overall genetic diversity of the population.

Additionally, Rhodobacter capsulatus is a significant Model organism in research, due to its terminal Cytochrome c oxidase the cbb_{3}-type cytochrome c oxidase, which is present in many pathogenic species of bacteria. This allows for research into the biogenesis of the Cytochrome c oxidase and has led to the identification of assembly genes involved in the biogenesis and function of the cbb_{3}-type cytochrome c oxidase, notably by Hans-Georg Koch, leading to a better understanding of these clinically relevant pathogenic species.
