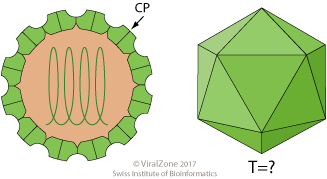

Virus classification
- (unranked): Virus
- Realm: Riboviria
- Order: Tombendovirales
- Family: Pamosaviridae
- Genus: Papanivirus
- Species: Papanivirus panici

Synonyms
- St. Augustine decline satellite virus, Panicum mosaic satellite virus

= Panicum mosaic satellite virus =

Species of virus

Panicum mosaic satellite virus (SPMV) is a plant satellite virus. It is the sole species in the genus Papanivirus, which is the sole genus in the family Pamosaviridae. It only infects grasses which are infected by Panicum mosaic virus. One study found that 72% of Stenotaphrum secundatum (St Augustine grass) infected with Panicum mosaic virus was also infected with SPMV. In addition to SPMV, many plants infected with panicum mosaic virus are also infected with satellite RNAs.

Trivial genome map of genus Papanivirus
