= Viroinformatics =

Bioinformatics for viruses

Viroinformatics is an amalgamation of virology with bioinformatics, involving the application of information and communication technology in various aspects of viral research. Currently there are more than 100 web servers and databases harboring knowledge regarding different viruses as well as distinct applications concerning diversity analysis, viral recombination, RNAi studies, drug design, protein–protein interaction, structural analysis etc.
