= Viropexis =

Viropexis is the process by which different classes of viruses—particularly picornaviruses and papovaviruses—enter the host cell in which they will be able to replicate. The hydrophobic structures of the capsid proteins may be exposed after viral binding to the cell (see viral attachment protein). These structures help the virion or the viral genome slip through the membrane. It can be juxtaposed with viral endocytosis, which is receptor mediated, and doesn't involve direct penetration of the virion.

== Sources ==
- Murray P; Rosenthal K; Michael P. Medical Microbiology (6th ed.). p. 47.
