= Bartonegtaviriform =

Virus classification
- Informal group: Subviral agents
- Informal group: Viriforms
- Family: Bartogtaviriformidae
- Genus: Bartonegtaviriform

Species
- Bartonegtaviriform andersoni

Synonyms
- Bartonegtaviriform andersoni: Bartonella gene transfer agent; BaGTA

Genus of viruses

Bartonegtaviriform is a genus of viriforms in the family Bartogtaviriformidae. It includes one species: Bartonegtaviriform andersoni (BaGTA), which is a gene transfer agent, found within bacteria of the genus Bartonella.

== Name ==
The family name, Bartogtaviriformidae, is a portmanteau of Barto, from "host" Bartonella, gta from gene transfer agent and viriformidae, the fact that it is a viriform.

The genus name, Bartonegtaviriform, is a combination of Bartone, from "host" Bartonella, gta from gene transfer agent and viriform, the fact that it is a viriform.

The species name, andersoni is named after GTA researcher Burt Anderson, who first discovered BaGTA particles.

== Gene transfer agents ==
GTAs can be considered as a form of “domesticated” prophage—that is, ancestrally derived from a bacteriophage genome, but altered by the host to confer an adaptive benefit—and thus represent one of many phage-derived adaptive functions observed in bacterial genomes.

== Phylogeny ==
Genomic sequence analysis revealed that all bacteria of the genus Bartonella are characterized by the presence of a Bartonella-specific GTA (BaGTA), which shares no homologies to previously described GTA systems. BaGTA is encoded upstream from an origin of run-off replication (ROR), another conserved feature of Bartonella genomes that has been suggested to be linked to BaGTA activity. Phylogenetic analyses identified BaGTA as a key innovation associated with the adaptive radiation that characterizes these zoonotic bacterial pathogens. Although BaGTA is not directly linked to Bartonella pathogenicity, it has been proposed to drive the exchange and the diversification of host-interaction factors within Bartonella communities such as VirB type IV secretion system (T4SS) and its cognate Bartonella effector proteins. Maintenance of BaGTA is likely driven by selection to increase the likelihood of genetic exchange and facilitates adaptation to host-specific defense systems during infection.

== Role ==
Despite clear genomics-based arguments pointing to a central role for BaGTA in Bartonella biology, direct experimental evidence for its activity are scarce and the molecular mechanisms underlying its activity and regulation remain elusive.

== Genome ==
BaGTA particles are larger than RcGTA and contain 14 kb DNA fragments. Although this capacity could in principle allow BaGTA to package and transmit its 14 kb GTA cluster, DNA coverage measurements show reduced coverage of the cluster. An adjacent region of high coverage is thought to be due to local DNA replication.
