= Tonesaviridae =

Virus classification
- (unranked): Virus
- Realm: Riboviria
- Family: Tonesaviridae

Family of viruses

Tonesaviridae is a family of viruses.

== Taxonomy ==
The family contains the following genera:

- Albetovirus
- Aumaivirus
