= Phenotype mixing =

Phenotype mixing is a form of interaction between two viruses each of which holds its own unique genetic material. The two particles "share" coat proteins, therefore each has a similar assortment of identifying surface proteins, while having different genetic material. In other words; non-genetic interaction in which virus particles released from a cell that is infected with two different viruses have components from both the infecting agents, but with a genome from one of them.

It is also possible for a virus particle to hold copies of the genome from different parent viruses. This would be called genotype mixing.
