= Virus classification =

Organisation of viruses into a taxonomic system

Virus classification

Virus classification is the process of naming viruses and placing them into a taxonomic system similar to the classification systems used for cellular organisms.

Viruses are classified by phenotypic characteristics, such as morphology, nucleic acid type, mode of replication, host organisms, and the type of disease they cause. The formal taxonomic classification of viruses is the responsibility of the International Committee on Taxonomy of Viruses (ICTV) system, although the Baltimore classification system can be used to place viruses into one of seven groups based on their manner of mRNA synthesis. Specific naming conventions and further classification guidelines are set out by the ICTV.

In 2021, the ICTV changed the International Code of Virus Classification and Nomenclature (ICVCN) to mandate a binomial format (genus|| ||species) for naming new viral species similar to that used for cellular organisms; the names of species coined prior to 2021 are gradually being converted to the new format. By 2025, almost all species had been given binomial names.

As of 2025, the ICTV taxonomy listed 16,213 named virus species (including some classed as satellite viruses and others as viroids) in 3,768 genera, 368 families, 93 orders, 49 classes, 22 phyla, 11 kingdoms and 7 realms. However, the number of named viruses considerably exceeds the number of named virus species since, by contrast to the classification systems used elsewhere in biology, a virus "species" is a collective name for a group of (presumably related) viruses sharing certain common features (see below). Also, the use of the term "kingdom" in virology does not equate to its usage in other biological groups, where it reflects high level groupings that separate completely different kinds of organisms (see Kingdom (biology)).

== Definitions ==
=== Virus definition ===
The currently accepted and formal definition of a 'virus' was accepted by the ICTV Executive Committee in November 2020 and ratified in March 2021, and is as follows:

Viruses sensu stricto are defined operationally by the ICTV as a type of MGE that encodes at least one protein that is a major component of the virion encasing the nucleic acid of the respective MGE and therefore the gene encoding the major virion protein itself or MGEs that are clearly demonstrable to be members of a line of evolutionary descent of such major virion protein-encoding entities. Any monophyletic group of MGEs that originates from a virion protein-encoding ancestor should be classified as a group of viruses.

=== Species definition ===
Species form the basis for any biological classification system. Before 1982, it was thought that viruses could not be made to fit Ernst Mayr's reproductive concept of species, and so were not amenable to such treatment. In 1982, the ICTV started to define a species as "a cluster of strains" with unique identifying qualities. In 1991, the more specific principle that a virus species is a polythetic class of viruses that constitutes a replicating lineage and occupies a particular ecological niche was adopted.

As of 2021 (the latest edition of the ICVCN), the ICTV definition of species states: "A species is the lowest taxonomic level in the hierarchy approved by the ICTV. A species is a monophyletic group of MGEs (mobile genetic elements) whose properties can be distinguished from those of other species by multiple criteria", with the comment "The criteria by which different species within a genus are distinguished shall be established by the appropriate Study Group. These criteria may include, but are not limited to, natural and experimental host range, cell and tissue tropism, pathogenicity, vector specificity, antigenicity, and the degree of relatedness of their genomes or genes. The criteria used should be published in the relevant section of the ICTV Report and reviewed periodically by the appropriate Study Group."

=== Below species rank (named viruses/virus strains/isolates) ===
Many individually named viruses exist at below the rank of virus species. The ICVCN gives the examples of blackeye cowpea mosaic virus and peanut stripe virus, which are both classified in the species Potyvirus phaseovulgaris, which is a member of the genus Potyvirus. As another example, the virus SARS-CoV-1, that causes severe acute respiratory syndrome (SARS) is different from the virus SARS-CoV-2, the cause of the COVID-19 pandemic, but both are classified within the same virus species, Betacoronavirus pandemicum (formerly known as Severe acute respiratory syndrome–related coronavirus). As set out in the ICVCN, section 3.4, the names [and definitions] of taxa below the rank of species are not governed by the ICTV; "Naming of such entities is not the responsibility of the ICTV but of international specialty groups. It is the responsibility of ICTV Study Groups to consider how these entities may best be classified into species." Using the example given above, the virus causing the COVID-19 pandemic was given the designation "SARS-CoV-2" by the Coronaviridae Study Group (CSG) of the International Committee on Taxonomy of Viruses in 2020; in the same publication, this Study Group recommended a naming convention for particular isolates of this virus "resembl[ing] the formats used for isolates of avian coronaviruses, filoviruses and influenza virus" in the format virus/host/location/isolate/date, with a cited example as "SARS-CoV-2/human/Wuhan/X1/2019".

== ICTV classification ==
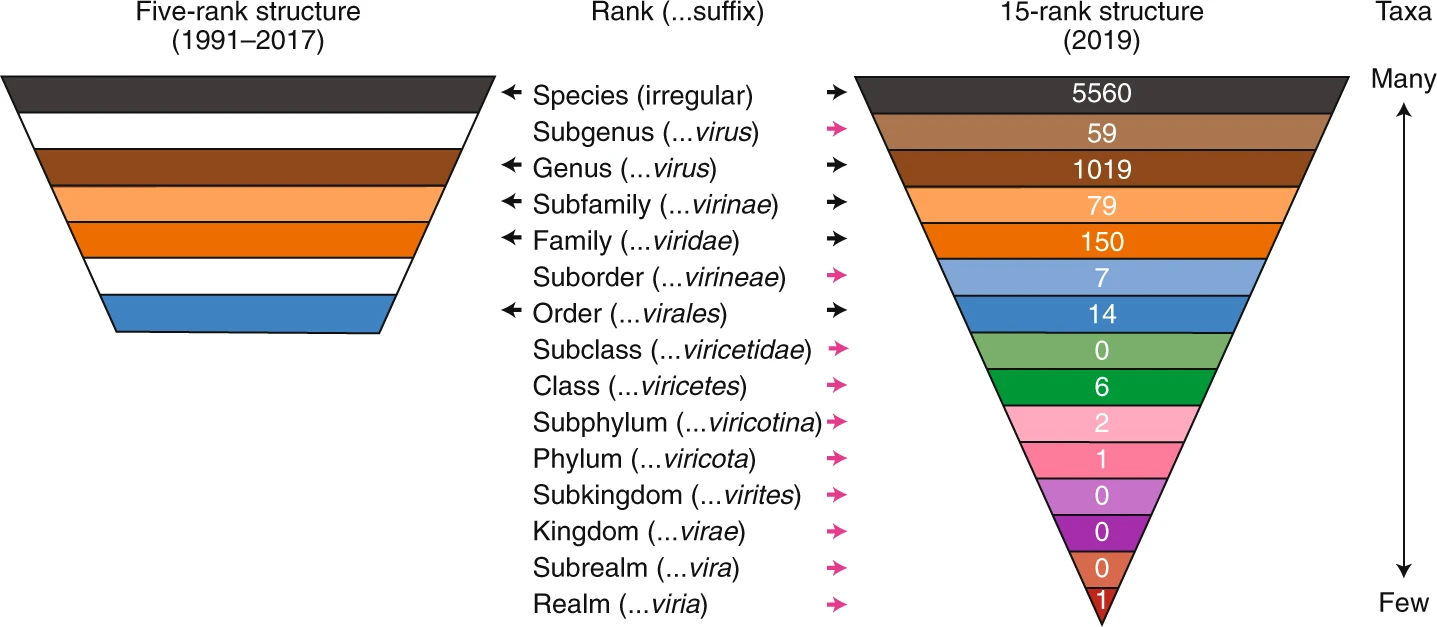
Comparison 1991 and 2018b virus taxonomy by ICTV

The International Committee on Taxonomy of Viruses (ICTV) began to devise and implement rules for the naming and classification of viruses early in the 1970s, an effort that continues to the present. The ICTV is the only body charged by the International Union of Microbiological Societies with the task of developing, refining, and maintaining a universal virus taxonomy, following the methods set out in the International Code of Virus Classification and Nomenclature (ICVCN). The system shares many features with the classification system of cellular organisms, such as taxon structure. However, some differences exist, such as the universal use of italics for all taxonomic names, unlike in the International Code of Nomenclature for algae, fungi, and plants and International Code of Zoological Nomenclature. Integrative genomic analyses, incorporating pangenomics and phylogenomics, have recently suggested that viral family-level diversity is significantly higher than currently formally recognized. For example, research on the 'extended Asfarviridae' clade of giant viruses indicates that these lineages are deeply divergent, supporting their division into multiple distinct families.

Viral classification starts at the level of realm and continues as follows, with the taxonomic suffixes in parentheses:

Realm (-viria)

Subrealm (-vira)

Kingdom (-virae)

Subkingdom (-virites)

Phylum (-viricota)

Subphylum (-viricotina)

Class (-viricetes)

Subclass (-viricetidae)

Order (-virales)

Suborder (-virineae)

Family (-viridae)

Subfamily (-virinae)

Genus (-virus)

Subgenus (-virus)

Species (-virus)

In parallel to the system of binomial nomenclature adopted in cellular species, the ICTV has recently (2021) mandated that new virus species be named using a binomial format (Genus species, e.g. Betacoronavirus pandemicum), and that pre-existing virus species names be progressively replaced with new names in the binomial format. A mid-2023 review of the status of this changeover stated: "...a large number of proposals [concerning virus nomenclature, submitted to the ICTV Executive Committee (EC) for its consideration] renamed existing species for compliance with the recently mandated binomial nomenclature format. As a result, 8,982 out of the current 11,273 species (80%) now have binomial names. The 2024 release of the ICTV virus taxonomy lists "a current total of 16,213 species, almost all of which possess binomial names."

As of 2026, all levels of taxa except subrealm, subkingdom, and subclass are used. Ten realms, one incertae sedis class, 29 incertae sedis families, and one incertae sedis genus are recognized:

Realms:

- Adnaviria
- Duplodnaviria
- Efunaviria
- Floreoviria
- Pleomoviria
- Riboviria
- Ribozyviria
- Singelaviria
- Varidnaviria
- Volvereviria

Incertae sedis classes:

- Naldaviricetes

Incertae sedis families:

- Alphasatellitidae
- Ampullaviridae
- Avsunviroidae
- Bartogtaviriformidae
- Basaltiviridae
- Bicaudaviridae
- Brachygtaviriformidae
- Clavaviridae
- Eurekaviridae
- Fuselloviridae
- Globuloviridae
- Guttaviridae
- Halspiviridae
- Huangdiviridae
- Itzamnaviridae
- Lomiviridae
- Nipumfusiviridae
- Obscuriviridae
- Ovaliviridae
- Plasmaviridae
- Polydnaviriformidae
- Portogloboviridae
- Pospiviroidae
- Rhodogtaviriformidae
- Spiraviridae
- Thaspiviridae
- Tolecusatellitidae
- Xigoviridae
- Yamazakiviridae

Incertae sedis genus:

- Dinodnavirus

=== Structure-based virus classification ===
It has been suggested that similarity in virion assembly and structure observed for certain viral groups infecting hosts from different domains of life (e.g., bacterial tectiviruses and eukaryotic adenoviruses or prokaryotic Caudovirales and eukaryotic herpesviruses) reflects an evolutionary relationship between these viruses. Therefore, structural relationship between viruses has been suggested to be used as a basis for defining higher-level taxa – structure-based viral lineages – that could complement the ICTV classification scheme of 2010.

The ICTV has gradually added many higher-level taxa using relationships in protein folds. All four realms defined in the 2019 release are defined by the presence of a protein of a certain structural family.

== Baltimore classification ==
The Baltimore Classification of viruses is based on the method of viral mRNA synthesis

Baltimore classification (first defined in 1971) is a classification system that places viruses into one of seven groups depending on a combination of their nucleic acid (DNA or RNA), strandedness (single-stranded or double-stranded), sense, and method of replication. Named after David Baltimore, a Nobel Prize-winning biologist, these groups are designated by Roman numerals. Other classifications are determined by the disease caused by the virus or its morphology, neither of which are satisfactory due to different viruses either causing the same disease or looking very similar. In addition, viral structures are often difficult to determine under the microscope. Classifying viruses according to their genome means that those in a given category will all behave in a similar fashion, offering some indication of how to proceed with further research. Viruses can be placed in one of the seven following groups:

- I: dsDNA viruses (e.g. Adenoviruses, Herpesviruses, Poxviruses)
- II: ssDNA viruses (+ strand or "sense") DNA (e.g. Parvoviruses)
- III: dsRNA viruses (e.g. Reoviruses)
- IV: (+)ssRNA viruses (+ strand or sense) RNA (e.g. Coronaviruses, Picornaviruses, Togaviruses)
- V: (−)ssRNA viruses (− strand or antisense) RNA (e.g. Orthomyxoviruses, Rhabdoviruses)
- VI: ssRNA-RT viruses (+ strand or sense) RNA with DNA intermediate in life-cycle (e.g. Retroviruses)
- VII: dsDNA-RT viruses DNA with RNA intermediate in life-cycle (e.g. Hepadnaviruses)

Visualization of the 7 groups of virus according to the Baltimore Classification

=== DNA viruses ===
Viruses with a DNA genome, except for the DNA reverse transcribing viruses, are members of three of the four recognized viral realms: Duplodnaviria, Monodnaviria, and Varidnaviria. But the incertae sedis order Ligamenvirales, and many other incertae sedis families and genera, are also used to classify DNA viruses. The domains Duplodnaviria and Varidnaviria consist of double-stranded DNA viruses; other double-stranded DNA viruses are incertae sedis. The domain Monodnaviria consists of single-stranded DNA viruses that generally encode a HUH endonuclease; other single-stranded DNA viruses are incertae sedis.

- Group I: viruses possess double-stranded DNA. Viruses that cause chickenpox and herpes are found here.
- Group II: viruses possess single-stranded DNA.

Examples of DNA viruses
Virus family	Examples (common names)	Virion naked/enveloped	Capsid symmetry	Nucleic acid type	Group
1. Adenoviridae	Canine hepatitis virus, Some types of the common cold	Naked	Icosahedral	ds	I
2. Papovaviridae	JC virus, HPV	Naked	Icosahedral	ds circular	I
3. Parvoviridae	Human parvovirus B19, canine parvovirus	Naked	Icosahedral	ss	II
4. Herpesviridae	Herpes simplex virus, varicella-zoster virus, cytomegalovirus, Epstein–Barr virus	Enveloped	Icosahedral	ds	I
5. Poxviridae	Smallpox virus, cowpox, myxoma virus, monkeypox, vaccinia virus	Complex coats	Complex	ds	I
6. Anelloviridae	Torque teno virus	Naked	Icosahedral	ss circular	II
7. Pleolipoviridae	HHPV1, HRPV1	Enveloped		ss/ds linear/circular	I/II

=== RNA viruses ===
All viruses that have an RNA genome, and that encode an RNA-dependent RNA polymerase (RdRp), are members of the kingdom Orthornavirae, within the realm Riboviria.

- Group III: viruses possess double-stranded RNA genomes, e.g. rotavirus.
- Group IV: viruses possess positive-sense single-stranded RNA genomes. Many well known viruses are found in this group, including the picornaviruses (which is a family of viruses that includes well-known viruses like Hepatitis A virus, enteroviruses, rhinoviruses, poliovirus, and foot-and-mouth virus), SARS virus, hepatitis C virus, yellow fever virus, and rubella virus.
- Group V: viruses possess negative-sense single-stranded RNA genomes. Ebola and Marburg viruses are well known members of this group, along with influenza virus, measles, mumps and rabies.

Examples of RNA viruses
Virus Family	Examples (common names)	Capsid naked/enveloped	Capsid Symmetry	Nucleic acid type	Group
1. Reoviridae	Reovirus, rotavirus	Naked	Icosahedral	ds	III
2. Picornaviridae	Enterovirus, rhinovirus, hepatovirus, cardiovirus, aphthovirus, poliovirus, parechovirus, erbovirus, kobuvirus, teschovirus, coxsackie	Naked	Icosahedral	ss	IV
3. Caliciviridae	Norwalk virus	Naked	Icosahedral	ss	IV
4. Togaviridae	Eastern equine encephalitis, Chikungunya	Enveloped	Icosahedral	ss	IV
5. Arenaviridae	Lymphocytic choriomeningitis virus, Lassa fever	Enveloped	Complex	ss(−)	V
6. Flaviviridae	Dengue virus, hepatitis C virus, yellow fever virus, Zika virus	Enveloped	Icosahedral	ss	IV
7. Orthomyxoviridae	Influenzavirus A, influenzavirus B, influenzavirus C, isavirus, thogotovirus	Enveloped	Helical	ss(−)	V
8. Paramyxoviridae	Measles virus, mumps virus, respiratory syncytial virus, Rinderpest virus, canine distemper virus	Enveloped	Helical	ss(−)	V
9. Bunyaviridae	California encephalitis virus, Sin nombre virus	Enveloped	Helical	ss(−)	V
10. Rhabdoviridae	Rabies virus, Vesicular stomatitis	Enveloped	Helical	ss(−)	V
11. Filoviridae	Ebola virus, Marburg virus	Enveloped	Helical	ss(−)	V
12. Coronaviridae	Human coronavirus 229E, Human coronavirus NL63, Human coronavirus OC43, Human coronavirus HKU1, Middle East respiratory syndrome-related coronavirus, Severe acute respiratory syndrome coronavirus, and Severe acute respiratory syndrome coronavirus 2	Enveloped	Helical	ss	IV
13. Astroviridae	Astrovirus	Naked	Icosahedral	ss	IV
14. Bornaviridae	Borna disease virus	Enveloped	Helical	ss(−)	V
15. Arteriviridae	Arterivirus, equine arteritis virus	Enveloped	Icosahedral	ss	IV
16. Hepeviridae	Hepatitis E virus	Naked	Icosahedral	ss	IV

=== Reverse transcribing viruses ===
All viruses that encode a reverse transcriptase (also known as RT or RNA-dependent DNA polymerase) are members of the class Revtraviricetes, within the phylum Arterviricota, kingdom Pararnavirae, and realm Riboviria. The class Blubervirales contains the single family Hepadnaviridae of DNA RT (reverse transcribing) viruses; all other RT viruses are members of the class Ortervirales.

- Group VI: viruses possess single-stranded RNA viruses that replicate through a DNA intermediate. The retroviruses are included in this group, of which HIV is a member.
- Group VII: viruses possess double-stranded DNA genomes and replicate using reverse transcriptase. The hepatitis B virus can be found in this group.

Examples of reverse transcribing viruses
Virus Family	Examples (common names)	Capsid naked/enveloped	Capsid Symmetry	Nucleic acid type	Group
1. Retroviridae	HIV	Enveloped		dimer RNA	VI
2. Caulimoviridae	Caulimovirus, Cacao swollen-shoot virus (CSSV)	Naked			VII
3. Hepadnaviridae	Hepatitis B virus	Enveloped	Icosahedral	circular, partially ds	VII

== Historical systems ==
=== Holmes classification ===
Holmes (1948) used a Linnaean taxonomy with binomial nomenclature to classify viruses into 3 groups under one order, Virales. They are placed as follows:

- Group I: Phaginae (attacks bacteria)
- Group II: Phytophaginae (attacks plants)
- Group III: Zoophaginae (attacks animals)

The system was not accepted by others due to its neglect of morphological similarities.

== Subviral agents ==
Subviral agents are smaller than viruses and have only some of their properties. Since 2015, the ICTV has allowed them to be classified in a similar way as viruses are.

=== Viroids and virus-dependent agents ===
==== Viroids ====
- Family Avsunviroidae
  - Genus Avsunviroid; type species: Avocado sunblotch viroid
  - Genus Pelamoviroid; type species: Peach latent mosaic viroid
  - Genus Elaviroid; type species: Eggplant latent viroid
- Family Pospiviroidae
  - Genus Pospiviroid; type species: Potato spindle tuber viroid
  - Genus Hostuviroid; type species: Hop stunt viroid
  - Genus Cocadviroid; type species: Coconut cadang-cadang viroid
  - Genus Apscaviroid; type species: Apple scar skin viroid
  - Genus Coleviroid; type species: Coleus blumei viroid 1

==== Satellites ====
Satellites depend on co-infection of a host cell with a helper virus for productive multiplication. Their nucleic acids have substantially distinct nucleotide sequences from either their helper virus or host. When a satellite subviral agent encodes the coat protein in which it is encapsulated, it is then called a satellite virus. When it does not, it is called a satellite nucleic acid.

Satellite-like nucleic acids resemble satellite nucleic acids, in that they replicate with the aid of helper viruses. However they differ in that they can encode functions that can contribute to the success of their helper viruses; while they are sometimes considered to be genomic elements of their helper viruses, they are not always found within their helper viruses.

- Satellite viruses
  - Single-stranded RNA satellite viruses
    - Family Tonesaviridae
      - Albetovirus – Tobacco necrosis satellite virus
      - Aumaivirus – Maize white line mosaic satellite virus
    - Family Pamosaviridae
      - Papanivirus – Panicum mosaic satellite virus
    - Family Tomosaviridae
      - Virtovirus – Tobacco mosaic satellite virus
    - Family Sarthroviridae
      - Macronovirus – Macrobrachium satellite virus 1 (extra small virus)
    - (unnamed genus) – Nilaparvata lugens commensal X virus
    - (unnamed genus) – Chronic bee-paralysis satellite virus
  - Double-stranded DNA satellite viruses
    - Family Lavidaviridae – Virophages
  - Single-stranded DNA satellite viruses
    - Genus Dependoparvovirus – Adeno-associated virus group
- Satellite nucleic acids
  - Single-stranded satellite DNAs
    - Family Alphasatellitidae (encoding a replication initiator protein)
    - Family Tolecusatellitidae (encoding a pathogenicity determinant βC1)
  - Double-stranded satellite RNAs
  - Single-stranded satellite RNAs
    - Subgroup 1: Large linear satellite RNAs
    - Subgroup 2: Small linear satellite RNAs
    - Subgroup 3: Circular satellite RNAs (virusoids)
    - Realm Ribozyviria / Family Kolmioviridae – Deltavirus-like satellite-like RNAs
      - Genus Deltavirus – Hepadnavirus-associated satellite-like RNAs
    - Polerovirus-associated RNAs
  - Satellite-like RNA
  - Satellite-like DNA

==== Defective interfering particles ====
Defective interfering particles are defective viruses that have lost their ability to replicate except in the presence of a helper virus, which is normally the parental virus. They can also interfere with the helper virus.

- Defective interfering particles (RNA)
- Defective interfering particles (DNA)

=== Viriforms ===
Viriforms are a polyphyletic category of endogenous viral elements. Sometime in their evolution, they became "domesticated" by their host as a key part of the host's lifecycle. The prototypical example is members of the (also polyphyletic) Polydnaviriformidae, which are used by wasps to send pieces of immunity-blunting DNA into the prey by packing them into virion-like particles. Other members are so-called gene transfer agents (GTAs) found among prokaryotes. GTA particles resemble tailed phages, but are smaller and carry mostly random pieces of host DNA. GTAs are produced by the host in times of stress; releasing GTAs kills the host cell, but allows pieces of its genetic material to live on in other bacteria, usually of the same species. The three known clades of GTAs, Rhodogtaviriformidae, Bartogtaviriformidae, and Brachygtaviriformidae, all arose independently from different parts of the Caudoviricetes family tree.

== See also ==
- Glossary of scientific naming
- Binomial nomenclature
- Biological classification
- International Committee on Taxonomy of Viruses
- List of virus genera
- Nomenclature codes
- Prion
- Taxon
- Taxonomy
- Trinomial nomenclature
- Virology
- Transposable element
- Retrozyme
