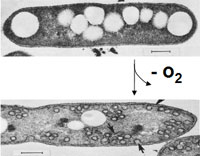
- Rhodobacter sphaeroides

Scientific classification
- Domain: Bacteria
- Kingdom: Pseudomonadati
- Phylum: Pseudomonadota
- Class: Alphaproteobacteria
- Order: Rhodobacterales
- Family: Paracoccaceae
- Genus: Rhodobacter; Imhoff et al. 1984

Type species
- Rhodobacter capsulatus

Species
- Rhodobacter aestuarii Venkata Ramana et al. 2009; Rhodobacter azotoformans Hiraishi et al. 1997; Rhodobacter blasticus corrig. (Eckersley and Dow 1981) Kawasaki et al. 1994; Rhodobacter capsulatus (Molisch 1907) Imhoff et al. 1984; Rhodobacter johrii Girija et al. 2010; Rhodobacter maris Venkata Ramana et al. 2008; Rhodobacter megalophilus Arunasri et al. 2008; Rhodobacter ovatus Srinivas et al. 2008; Rhodobacter sphaeroides (van Niel 1944) Imhoff et al. 1984; Rhodobacter veldkampii Hansen and Imhoff 1985; Rhodobacter vinaykumarii Srinivas et al. 2007; Rhodobacter viridis Shalem Raj et al. 2013

Synonyms
- Bieblia Hördt et al. 2020; Fuscovulum Suresh et al. 2020; Phaeovulum Suresh et al. 2020

= Rhodobacter =

Genus of bacteria

Rhodobacter is a genus of bacteria in the family Paracoccaceae. The most famous species of Rhodobacter are Rhodobacter sphaeroides and Rhodobacter capsulatus, which are used as model organisms to study bacterial photosynthesis.
