= Virological failure =

Virological failure is defined as the failure to meet a specific target of antiviral drug treatment, namely the non-attainment or non-maintenance of undetectable viral load, particularly in the treatment of HIV. As antiretroviral therapy is evaluated by detecting the amount of copies of the virus in blood samples, the concept of virological failure gives a way to modify treatment of this disease.

Virological failure in HIV is characterized by a confirmed viral load above 400 copies / ml after 24 weeks or above 50 copies / ml after 48 weeks of treatment or, even for individuals who have reached complete viral suppression, by confirmed rebound of viral load above 400 copies / ml. Non-adherence of HIV antiretroviral therapy increases the risk of drug suppression and resistance (Bangsberg, D. R., Moss, A. R., & Deeks, S. G. (2004)).

After the institution of antiretroviral treatment, basically three aspects of the evolution can characterize failure or therapeutic success: the evolution of viral load, T-CD4 + lymphocyte count and the occurrence of clinical events.

The progressive decline in T-CD4 + lymphocyte counts is characterized by immunologic failure. It should be considered, however, that there is a wide biological variability (individual and interindividual) in the counts of these cells, as well as laboratory variability related to the technical reproducibility of the test. There is also circadian variation of CD4 levels and therefore it is recommended that the sample for the test be obtained in the morning. Variability related to the various motifs described above may result in oscillations of up to 25% in absolute CD4 T-lymphocyte counts, with no clinical significance. It is therefore recommended that reductions greater than 25% in T-CD4 + lymphocyte counts are suspected of immunological failure and confirmation is given.
