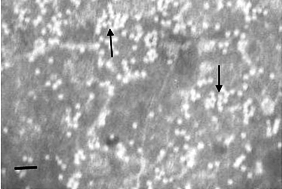
- Transmission electron micrographs of negatively-stained Extra small virus; bar = 50 nm

Virus classification
- (unranked): Virus
- Realm: Riboviria
- Order: Tombendovirales
- Family: Sarthroviridae
- Genus: Macronovirus

Species
- Macronovirus macrobrachii

Synonyms
- Macrobrachium satellite virus 1

= Macronovirus =

Genus of virus

Macronovirus is the only genus of the family Sarthroviridae. It contains one species: Extra small virus (XSV, Macronovirus macrobrachii).

It is found in The French West Indies, Thailand, Taiwan, China, and India.

== Etymology ==
The genus name, Macronovirus, is a combination of Macro, from the host Macrobrachium rosenbergii and no, from helper virus nodavirus.

The family name, Sarthroviridae, is a combination of S, from Small and arthro, from host arthropoda.

== Hosts ==
Macronovirus's cell tropism is muscle and connective cells of diseased animals, and its natural hosts are arthropods.

== Structure ==
The virion of XSV has a genome consisting of linear single-stranded RNA of positive polarity, 0.8kb in size, with two genes. This encodes two capsid proteins, CP-17 and CP-16. The virion is non-enveloped, spherical, with a capsid of about 15 nm with icosahedral symmetry. The virion is constructed from two capsid proteins CP-17 and CP-16. It has a Monopartite, linear, ssRNA(+) genome.

== Gene expression ==
The virion RNA is infectious and serves as both the genome and viral messenger RNA.

== Replication ==
Its replication is cytoplasmic, and has 8 steps.

1. Attachement to host receptors mediates entry into the host cell.
2. Uncoating, and release of the viral genomic RNA into the cytoplasm.
3. Viral RNA is translated in a polyprotein to produce replication proteins.
4. Replication by helper virus occurs in viral factories made of membrane vesicles derived from the ER. A dsRNA genome is synthesized from the genomic ssRNA(+).
5. The dsRNA genome is transcribed/replicated thereby providing viral mRNAs/new ssRNA(+) genomes.
6. Expression of the capsid proteins.
7. Assembly of new virus particles.
8. Virus release.

== Disease ==
Whitish muscle disease, which develops in post-larvae of freshwater prawn Macrobrachium rosenbergii and is caused by Macrobrachium rosenbergii nodavirus (MrNV) and its associate Extra small virus. Main symptom is a whitish appearance of the muscles, particularly noticeable in the abdomen. Mortalities can reach 100%.
