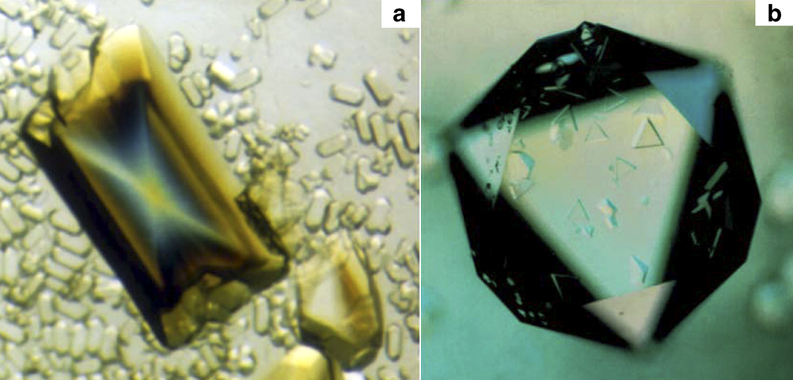
- Crystals of Tobacco virtovirus 1 grown in space. They are ca. ~1.5 mm long and ~30 times larger by volume than Earth-grown samples.

Virus classification
- (unranked): Virus
- Realm: Riboviria
- Order: Tombendovirales
- Family: Tomosaviridae
- Genus: Virtovirus
- Species: Tobacco virtovirus 1

Synonyms
- Tobacco mosaic satellite virus; Satellite tobacco mosaic virus

= Tobacco virtovirus 1 =

Species of satellite virus

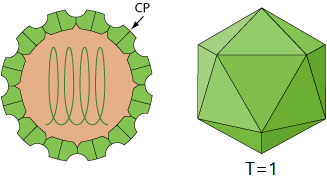
Schematic diagram of a Virtovirus particle, cross section and side view.

Tobacco virtovirus 1, informally called Tobacco mosaic satellite virus, Satellite tobacco mosaic virus (STMV), or tobacco mosaic satellite virus, is a satellite virus first reported in Nicotiana glauca from southern California, U.S.. Its genome consists of linear positive-sense single-stranded RNA.

The trivial genome map of satellite virus genera Virtovirus and Aumaivirus

Tobacco virtovirus 1 is a small, icosahedral plant virus which worsens the symptoms of infection by Tobacco mosaic virus (TMV). Satellite viruses are some of the smallest possible reproducing units in nature; they achieve this by relying on both the host cell and a host-virus (in this case, TMV) for the machinery necessary for them to reproduce. The entire Tobacco virtovirus 1 particle consists of 60 identical copies of a single protein (CP) that make up the viral capsid (coating), and a 1063-nucleotide single-stranded RNA genome which codes for the capsid and one other protein of unknown function.

In a broader sense, the Tobacco Mosaic Virus holds distinctive properties, which primarily include how they are distributed and the range of their hosts. They can be found within Nicotious Glauna plants, which are typically located in warmer areas, such as the United States in California and the South American region in Bolivia and Argentina. Satellite viruses like the Tobacco Vitro Virus 1 tend to be commonly located in the same tobacco tree plant(N. Glauca), which can be described as a tall shrub that possesses small leaves, that show signs of viral infection through its mosaic and yellow complexion. The Satellite Tobacco Mosaic Virus also has a variety of alternative virus helpers, which include tomatoes tobacco, and peppers, but has yet to be found in alternate crop plants.

Additionally, the Tobacco Mosaic Virus has distinctive features in cells, which are particularly instances where virus crystals may form, as well as other protein bodies within unit membrane-bound structures. The membrane that surrounds these crystals contains many vesicles which allows for genome replication to take place. These specific cells that are infected with the virus are also linked to characteristic features associated with infection from the virus the Tobacco Mild Green, showing that these individual cells are twice as infected. As replication occurs between the two viruses, they are separately compartmentalized within a single cell, which has implications for how the satellite virus uses the TMGMV virus gene products like replicates.
