= Helper virus =

Form of virus

A helper virus is a virus that allows an otherwise-deficient coinfecting virus to replicate. These can be naturally occurring as with Hepatitis D virus, which requires Hepatitis B virus to coinfect cells in order to replicate. Helper viruses are also commonly used to replicate and spread viral vectors for gene expression and gene therapy.

== See also ==
- Helper dependent virus
- Virophage
