= Hokovirus =

Virus classification
- (unranked): Virus
- Realm: Varidnaviria
- Kingdom: Bamfordvirae
- Phylum: Nucleocytoviricota
- Class: Megaviricetes
- Order: Imitervirales
- Family: Mimiviridae
- Subfamily: Klosneuvirinae
- Genus: Hokovirus

Hypothesized genus of giant double-stranded DNA-containing viruses

Hokovirus (HokV) is a genus of giant double-stranded DNA-containing viruses (NCLDV). This genus was detected during the analysis of metagenome samples of bottom sediments of reservoirs at the wastewater treatment plant in Klosterneuburg, Austria. New Klosneuvirus (KNV), Catovirus and Indivirus genera (all found in these sewage waters) were also described together with Hokovirus, building up a putative virus subfamily Klosneuvirinae (Klosneuviruses) with KNV as type genus. Hokovirus has a large genome of 1.33 million base pairs (881 gene families). This is the third largest genome among known Klosneuviruses after KNV (1.57 million base pairs, 1272 gene families) and Catovirus. GC content is 21.4 % Classification of metagenome, made by analyzing 18S rRNA indicate that their hosts are relate to the simple Cercozoa.

Phylogenetic tree topology of Mimiviridae is still under discussion. Some authors (CNS 2018) like to put Klosneuviruses together with Cafeteria roenbergensis virus (CroV) and Bodo saltans virus (BsV) into a tentative subfamily called Aquavirinae. Another proposal is to put them together with Mimiviruses into a subfamily Megavirinae.

== See also ==
- Nucleocytoplasmic large DNA viruses
- Girus
- Mimiviridae
