= Indivirus =

Virus classification
- (unranked): Virus
- Realm: Varidnaviria
- Kingdom: Bamfordvirae
- Phylum: Nucleocytoviricota
- Class: Megaviricetes
- Order: Imitervirales
- Family: Mimiviridae
- Subfamily: Klosneuvirinae
- Genus: Indivirus

Hypothesized genus of giant double-stranded DNA-containing viruses

Indivirus (IndV) is a genus of giant double-stranded DNA-containing viruses (NCLDV). This genus was detected during the analysis of metagenome samples of bottom sediments of reservoirs at the wastewater treatment plant in Klosterneuburg, Austria. New Klosneuvirus (KNV), Hokovirus and Catovirus genera (all found in these sewage waters) were also described together with Indivirus, building up a putative virus subfamily Klosneuvirinae (Klosneuviruses) with KNV as type genus. Indivirus has a genome of 0.86 million base pairs (660 gene families). This is the smallest genome among Klosneuviruses as mentioned above. GC content is 26.6 % Classification of metagenome, made by analyzing 18S rRNA indicate that their hosts are relate to the simple Cercozoa.

Phylogenetic tree topology of Mimiviridae is still under discussion. Some authors (CNS 2018) like to put Klosneuviruses together with Cafeteria roenbergensis virus (CroV) and Bodo saltans virus (BsV) into a tentative subfamily called Aquavirinae. Another proposal is to put them all together with Mimiviruses into a subfamily Megavirinae.

== See also ==
- Nucleocytoplasmic large DNA viruses
- Girus
- Mimiviridae
