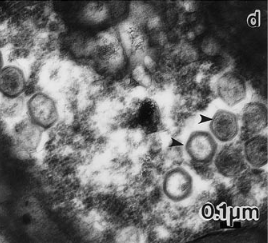
- Thin sections of a cell from Haptolina ericina infected with CeV-01B

Virus classification
- (unranked): Virus
- Realm: Varidnaviria
- Kingdom: Bamfordvirae
- Phylum: Nucleocytoviricota
- Class: Megaviricetes
- Order: Imitervirales
- Family: Mimiviridae (?)
- Virus: Chrysochromulina ericina virus 01B

= Chrysochromulina ericina virus =

Chrysochromulina ericina virus 01B

Giant virus

Chrysochromulina ericina virus 01B, or simply Chrysochromulina ericina virus (CeV) is a giant virus in the family Mimiviridae infecting Haptolina ericina (previously assigned to the genus Chrysochromulina), a marine microalgae member of the Haptophyta. CeV is a dsDNA virus.

== History and taxonomy ==
CeV was discovered in the Norwegian coastal waters in 1998. It was then isolated and characterized. It was then believed to belong to the phycodnaviridae along with all other known algae infecting viruses. The discovery of Acanthamoeba polyphaga mimivirus helped to discover that there existed marine mimiviruses that could infect microalgae. A CeV strain was later found in the Gulf of Main in 2013 and the phylogenetic analysis of some specific marker confirmed its proximity with mimiviruses. In 2015, CeV was fully sequenced to classify it as a mimiviridae

It was more recently proposed a group of mimiviridae infecting microalgae that would include CeV together with Phaeocystis globosa virus (PgV) infecting a haptophyceae and Aureococcus anophagefferens virus (AaV) infecting a stramenopile.

== Structure ==
CeV has a diameter of 160 nm. It has an icosahedral structure and no external membrane.

== Genome ==
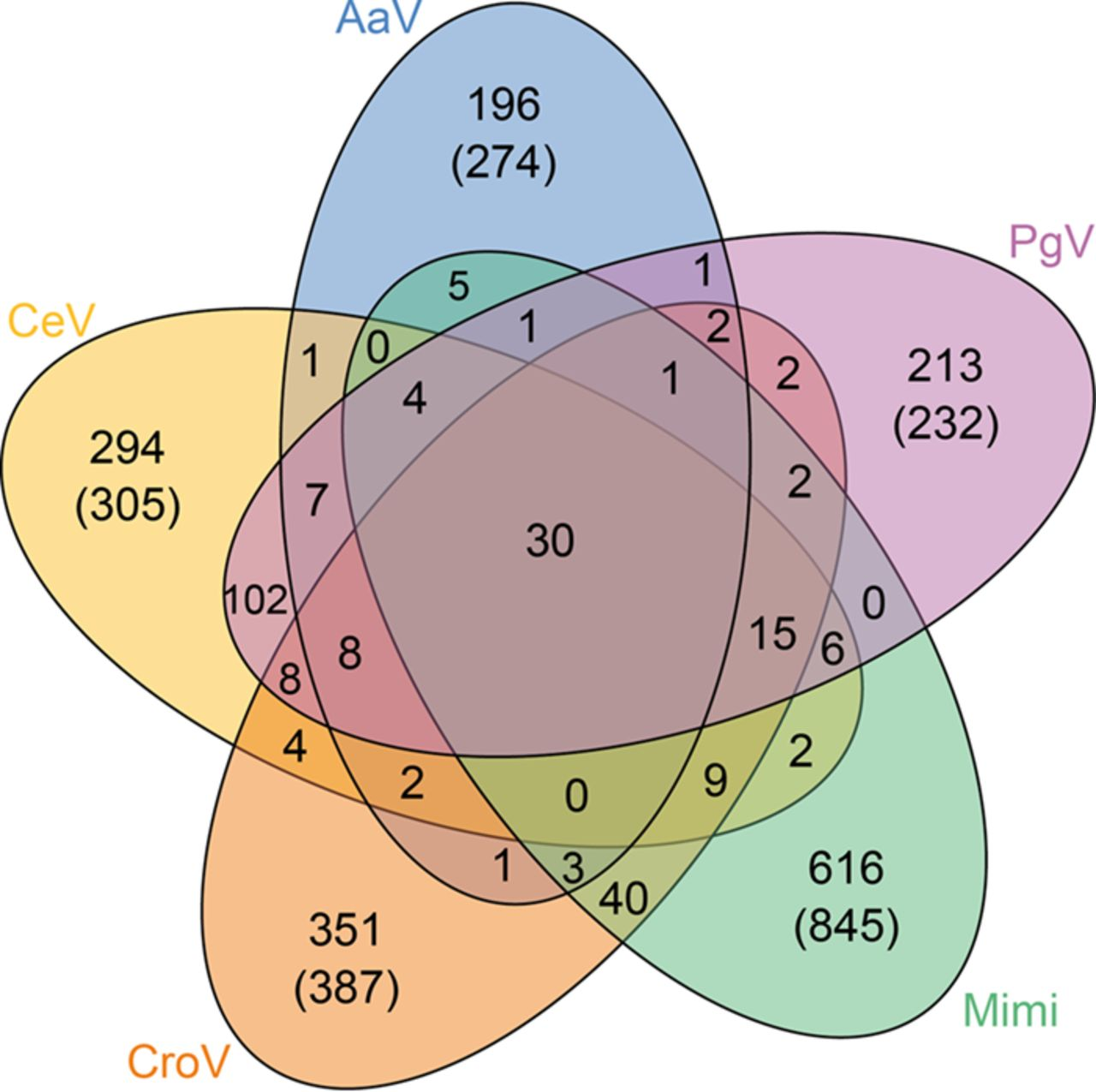
Diagram showing the proximity of gene content of five members of the family Mimiviridae

CeV’s genome has 473,558 bp and a low G-C content of 25%. It is predicted to have 512 ORFs. CeV possess a large number of core genes like the major capsid protein and the DNA polymerase B close to the respective genes of PgV. CeV may have the ability to repair its DNA as it is suggested by the presence of the sequences of MutS7 and an ERCC4-type DNA repair nuclease (which are involved in DNA repair). This last enzyme is typically used for repairing DNA damage caused by UV light which is consistent with the habitat of a mimiviridae infecting a photosynthetic host. It has also 305 unique genes that found no match in the public databases

== Viral cycle ==
Little is known about CeV’s cycle. It replicates in the host’s cytoplasm and its lytic cycle lasts 14 to 19 hours. CeV possess in its genome a sequence coding for a DNA polymerase and two RNA-polymerase II DNA-dependent. It also has twelve tRNA indicating an important machinery allowing for a relative independent replication and virion formation that is characteristic for mimiviridae.
