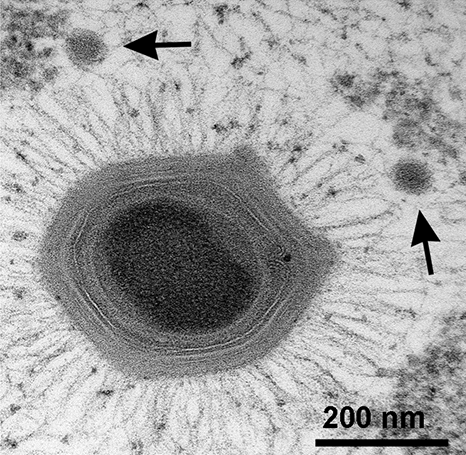
- Mimivirus with two satellite Sputnik virophages (arrows)

Virus classification
- (unranked): Virus
- Realm: Varidnaviria
- Kingdom: Bamfordvirae
- Phylum: Nucleocytoviricota
- Class: Megaviricetes
- Order: Imitervirales
- Family: Mimiviridae
- Subfamily: Megamimivirinae
- Genus: Mimivirus

= Mimivirus =

Genus of viruses

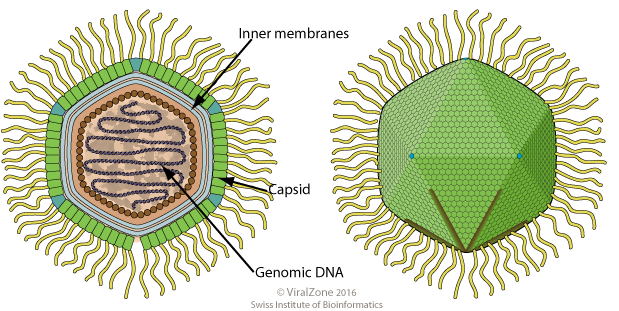
Schematic drawing of a virion of genus Mimivirus (cross section and side view) showing filaments ("hairs") and stargate (downside)

Mimivirus is a genus of giant viruses, in the family Mimiviridae. It is believed that Amoeba serve as their natural hosts. It also refers to a group of phylogenetically related large viruses.

In colloquial speech, Acanthamoeba polyphaga mimivirus (APMV) is more commonly referred to as just "mimivirus". Mimivirus, short for "mimicking microbe", is so called to reflect its large size and apparent Gram-staining properties.

Mimivirus has a large and complex genome compared with most other viruses. Until 2013, when a larger virus Pandoravirus was described, it had the largest capsid diameter of all known viruses.

== History ==
APMV was discovered accidentally in 1992 within the amoeba Acanthamoeba polyphaga, after which it is named, during research into legionellosis by researchers from Marseille and Leeds. The virus was observed in a Gram stain and mistakenly thought to be a Gram-positive bacterium. As a consequence it was named Bradfordcoccus, after Bradford, England, where the amoeba had originated. In 2003, researchers at the Université de la Méditerranée in Marseille, France, published a paper in Science identifying the micro-organism as a virus. It was given the name "mimivirus" (for "mimicking microbe") as it resembles a bacterium on Gram staining.

The same team that discovered the mimivirus later discovered a slightly larger virus, dubbed the mamavirus, and the Sputnik virophage that infects it.

== Classification ==
Mimivirus has been placed into a viral family by the International Committee on Taxonomy of Viruses as a member of the Mimiviridae, and has been placed into Group I of the Baltimore classification system.

Although not strictly a method of classification, mimivirus joins a group of large viruses known as nucleocytoplasmic large DNA viruses (NCLDV). They are all large viruses which share both molecular characteristics and large genomes. The mimivirus genome also possesses 21 genes encoding homologs to proteins which are seen to be highly conserved in the majority of NCLDVs, and further work suggests that mimivirus is an early divergent of the general NCLDV group.

The genus Mimivirus contains the following species:

- Mimivirus bradfordmassiliense
- Mimivirus lagoaense

== Structure ==
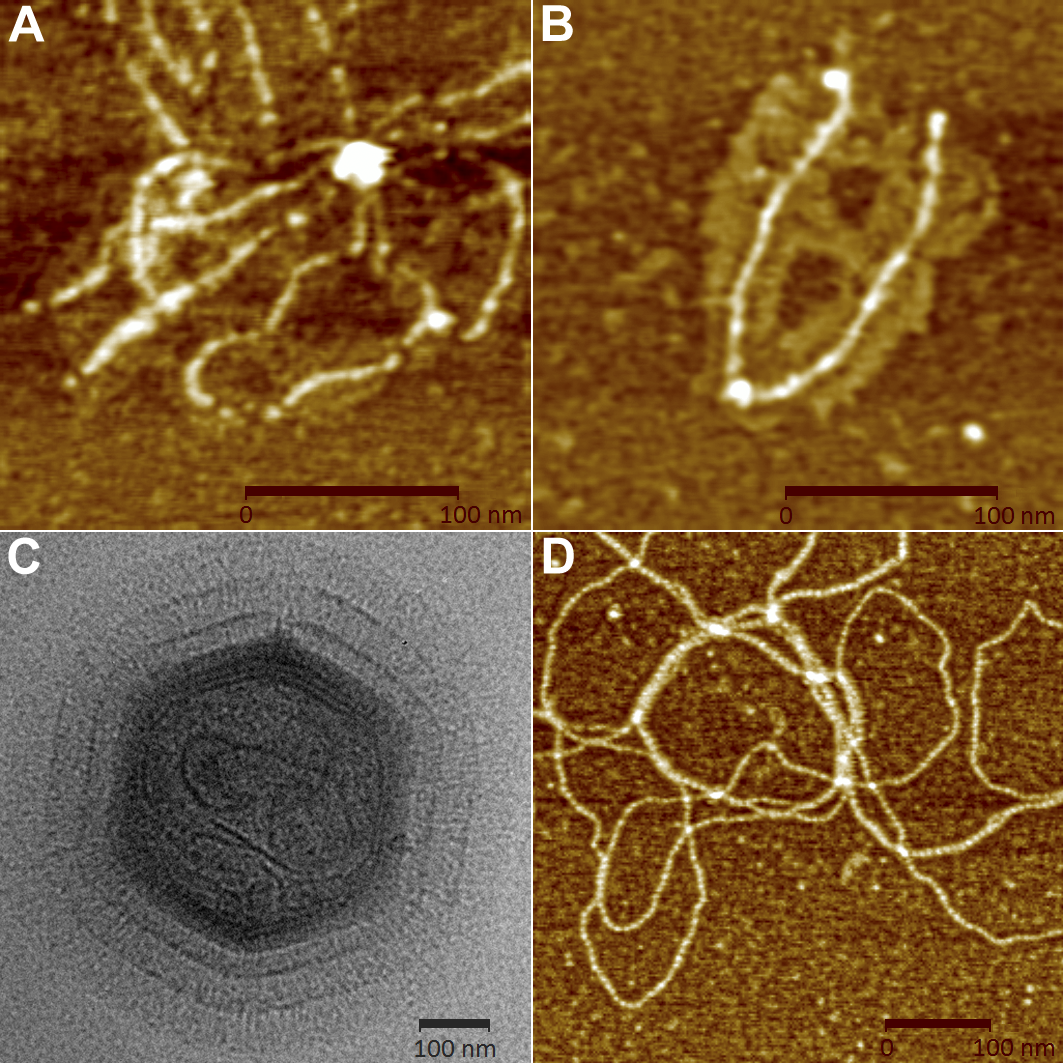
A: AFM image of several surface fibers attached to a common central feature. B: AFM image of two detached surface fibers of Mimivirus. C: CryoEM image of a Mimivirus after partial digestion of fibrils with Bromelain. D: AFM image of internal fibers of Mimivirus

The mimivirus is the fourth-largest virus, after the Megavirus chilensis, Pandoravirus and Pithovirus. Mimivirus has a capsid diameter of 400 nm. Protein filaments measuring 100 nm project from the surface of the capsid, bringing the total length of the virus up to 600 nm. Variation in scientific literature renders these figures as highly approximate, with the "size" of the virion being casually listed as anywhere between 400 nm and 800 nm, depending on whether total length or capsid diameter is actually quoted.

Its capsid appears hexagonal under an electron microscope, therefore the capsid symmetry is icosahedral. It does not appear to possess an outer viral envelope, suggesting that the virus does not exit the host cell by exocytosis. Mimivirus shares several morphological characteristics with all members of the NCLDV group of viruses. The condensed central core of the virion appears as a dark region under the electron microscope. The large genome of the virus resides within this area. An internal lipid layer surrounding the central core is present in all other NCLDV viruses, so this features may also be present in mimivirus.

Several mRNA transcripts can be recovered from purified virions. Like other NCLDVs, transcripts for DNA polymerase, a capsid protein and a TFII-like transcription factor were found. However, three distinct aminoacyl tRNA synthetase enzyme transcripts and four unknown mRNA molecules specific to mimivirus were also found. These pre-packaged transcripts can be translated without viral gene expression and are likely to be necessary to Mimivirus for replication. Other DNA viruses, such as the Human cytomegalovirus and Herpes simplex virus type-1, also feature pre-packaged mRNA transcripts.

Genus	Structure	Symmetry	Capsid	Genomic arrangement	Genomic segmentation
Mimivirus	Icosahedral	T = 972–1141 or T = 1200 (h = 19 ± 1, k = 19 ± 1)		Linear	Monopartite

== Genome ==
The mimivirus genome is a linear, double-stranded molecule of DNA with 1,181,404 base pairs in length. This makes it one of the largest viral genomes known, outstripping the next-largest virus genome of the Cafeteria roenbergensis virus by about 450,000 base pairs. In addition, it is larger than at least 30 cellular clades.

In addition to the large size of the genome, mimivirus possesses an estimated 979 protein-coding genes. Analysis of its genome revealed the presence of genes not seen in any other viruses, including aminoacyl tRNA synthetases, and other genes previously thought only to be encoded by cellular organisms. Like other large DNA viruses, mimivirus contains several genes for sugar, lipid and amino acid metabolism, as well as some metabolic genes not found in any other virus. Roughly 90% of the genome was of coding capacity, with the other 10% being "junk DNA".

== Replication ==
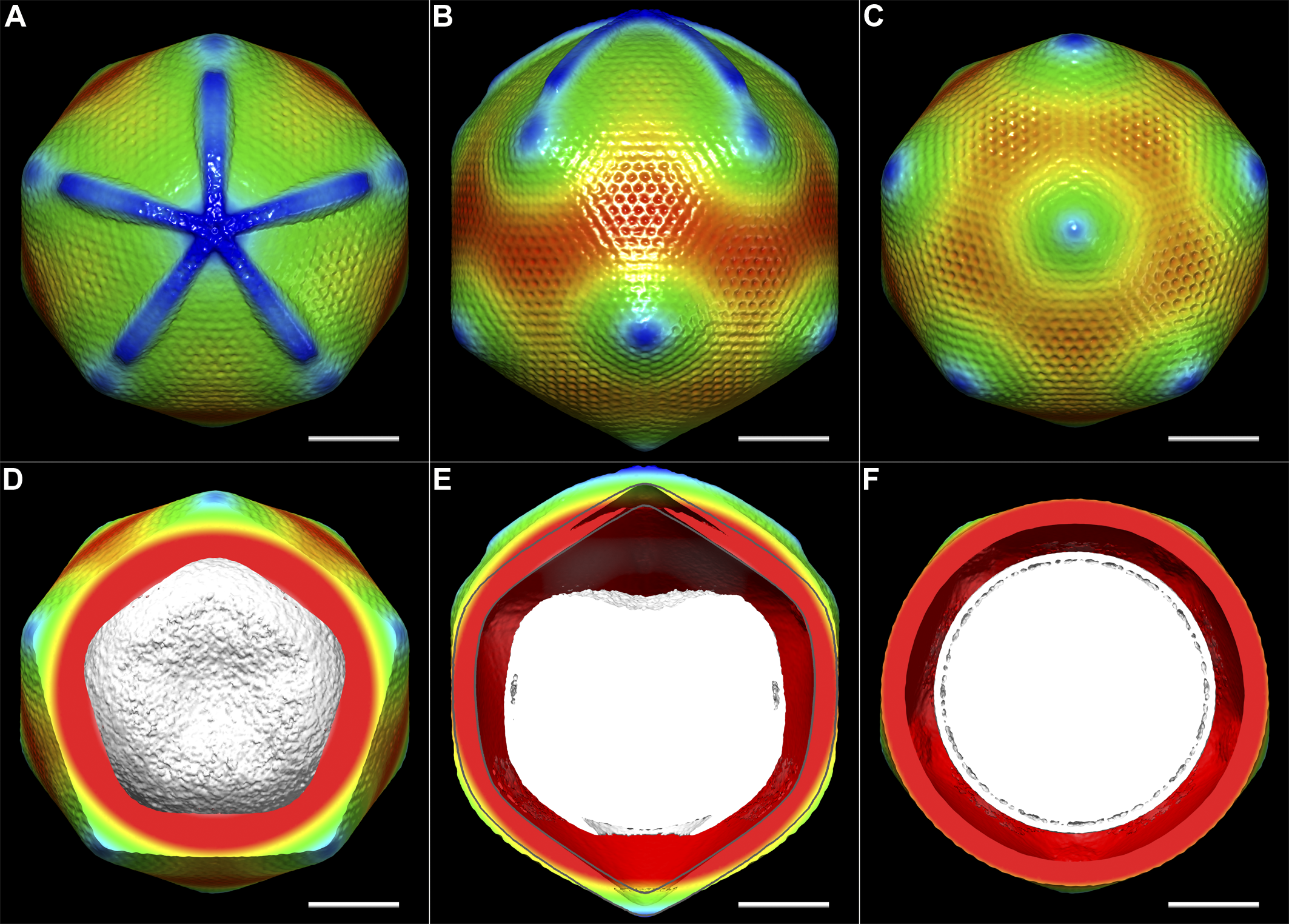
CryoEM reconstruction of Mimivirus A) – C) Surface-shaded rendering of cryoEM reconstruction of untreated Mimivirus D) The starfish-associated vertex was removed to show the internal nucleocapsid E) Central slice of the reconstruction looking from the side of the particle F) Central slice of the reconstruction looking along the 5-fold axis from the starfish-shaped feature The coloring is based on radial distance from the center of the virus Gray is from 0 to 1,800 Å Red from 1,800 to 2,100 Å Rainbow coloring from red to blue between 2,100 and 2,500 Å

The stages of mimivirus replication are not well known, but as a minimum it is known that mimivirus attaches to a chemical receptor on the surface of an amoeba cell and is taken into the cell. Once inside, an eclipse phase begins, in which the virus disappears and all appears normal within the cell. After about 4 hours small accumulations can be seen in areas of the cell. 8 hours after infection many mimivirus virions are clearly visible within the cell. The cell cytoplasm continues to fill with newly synthesised virions, and about 24 hours after initial infection the cell likely bursts open to release the new mimivirus virions.

Little is known about the details of this replication cycle, most obviously attachment to the cell surface and entry, viral core release, DNA replication, transcription, translation, assembly and release of progeny virions. However, scientists have established the general overview given above using electron micrographs of infected cells. These micrographs show mimivirus capsid assembly in the nucleus, acquisition of an inner lipid membrane via budding from the nucleus, and particles similar to those found in many other viruses, including all NCLDV members. These particles are known in other viruses as viral factories and allow efficient viral assembly by modifying large areas of the host cell.

Genus	Host details	Tissue tropism	Entry details	Release details	Replication site	Assembly site	Transmission
Mimivirus	Zooplankton	None	Unknown	Unknown	Cytoplasm	Nucleus	Passive diffusion

== Pathogenicity ==
Mimivirus may be a causative agent of some forms of pneumonia; this is based mainly on indirect evidence in the form of antibodies to the virus discovered in pneumonia patients. However, the classification of mimivirus as a pathogen is tenuous at present as there have been only a couple of papers published potentially linking mimivirus to actual cases of pneumonia. A significant fraction of pneumonia cases are of unknown cause, though a mimivirus has been isolated from a Tunisian woman suffering from pneumonia. There is evidence that mimivirus can infect macrophages.

== See also ==
- Cafeteria roenbergensis virus—a giant marine virus
- Mamavirus
- Marseillevirus—another giant virus
- Megavirus—another giant virus
- Mycoplasma genitalium—one of the smallest bacteria
- Nanoarchaeum equitans—smallest known independent cell
- Nanobacterium
- Nanobe
- Non-cellular life
- Pandoravirus
- Pithovirus—the largest known virus
- Parvovirus—smallest known viruses
- Pelagibacter ubique—possesses one of the smallest bacterial genomes
- Virophage—a virus that requires the host cell to be co-infected with a giant virus
- The Giant Virus Finder is a software tool that identifies giant viruses in environmental Metagenomes.
