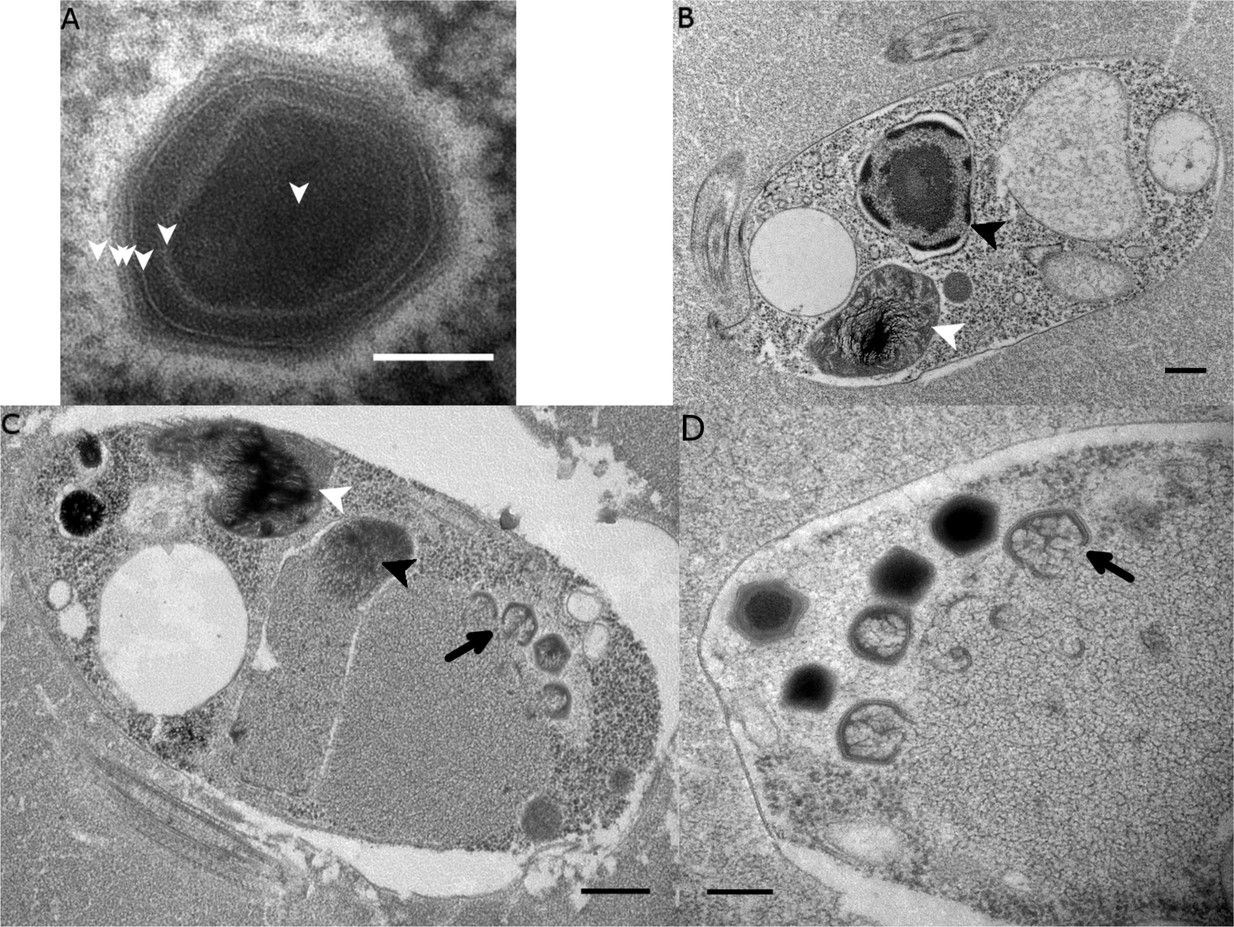

Virus classification
- (unranked): Virus
- Realm: Varidnaviria
- Kingdom: Bamfordvirae
- Phylum: Nucleocytoviricota
- Class: Megaviricetes
- Order: Imitervirales
- Family: Mimiviridae
- Subfamily: Klosneuvirinae
- Genus: Klosneuvirus

= Klosneuvirus =

Genus of viruses

Klosneuvirus (KNV, also KloV) is a type of giant virus found by the analysis of low-complexity metagenomes from a wastewater treatment plant in Klosterneuburg, Austria. It has a 1.57-Mb genome coding unusually high number of genes typically found in cellular organisms, including aminoacyl transfer RNA synthetases with specificities for 19 different amino acids, over 10 translation factors and several tRNA-modifying enzymes. Klosneuvirus, Indivirus, Catovirus and Hokovirus, are part of a group of giant viruses denoted as Klosneuviruses or Klosneuvirinae, a proposed subfamily of the Mimiviridae.

Species in this clade include Bodo saltans virus infecting the kinetoplastid Bodo saltans.

Phylogenetic tree topology of Mimiviridae is still under discussion. As Klosneuviruses are related to Mimivirus, it was proposed to put them all together into a subfamily Megavirinae. Other authors (CNS 2018) like to put Klosneuviruses just together with Cafeteria roenbergensis virus (CroV) and Bodo saltans virus (BsV) into a tentative subfamily called Aquavirinae.

== See also ==
- Nucleocytoplasmic large DNA viruses
- Giant Virus
- Viral eukaryogenesis
- Mimiviridae
