= Catovirus =

Virus classification
- (unranked): Virus
- Realm: Varidnaviria
- Kingdom: Bamfordvirae
- Phylum: Nucleocytoviricota
- Class: Megaviricetes
- Order: Imitervirales
- Family: Mimiviridae
- Subfamily: Klosneuvirinae
- Genus: Catovirus

Hypothesized genus of giant viruses

Catovirus (CatV) is a genus of giant double-stranded DNA–containing viruses (nucleocytoplasmic large DNA viruses). This genus was detected during the analysis of metagenome samples of bottom sediments of reservoirs at the wastewater treatment plant in Klosterneuburg, Austria.

New Klosneuvirus (KNV), Hokovirus and Indivirus genera (all found in these sewage waters) were also described together with Catovirus, building up a putative virus subfamily Klosneuvirinae (Klosneuviruses) with KNV as type genus. Catovirus has a large genome of 1.53 million base pairs (1176 gene families). This is the second largest genome among known Klosneuviruses after KNV (1.57 million base pairs, 1272 gene families). GC content is 26.4 % Classification of metagenomes made by analyzing 18S rRNA indicate that their hosts may be related to the simple Cercozoa.

The genus contains one species: Catovirus klosterense.

== See also ==
- Nucleocytoplasmic large DNA viruses
- Girus
