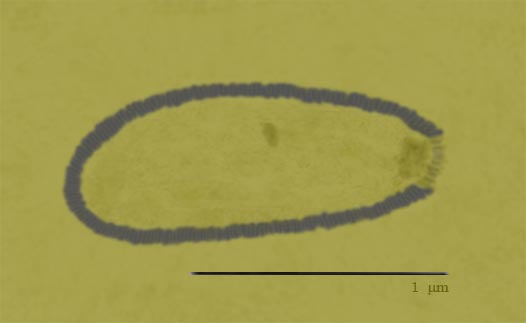
- Alphapithovirus siberiense

Virus classification
- (unranked): Virus
- Realm: Varidnaviria
- Kingdom: Bamfordvirae
- Phylum: Nucleocytoviricota
- Class: Megaviricetes
- Order: Pimascovirales
- Family: Pithoviridae
- Subfamily: Orthopithovirinae
- Genus: Alphapithovirus

Species
- Alphapithovirus massiliense; Alphapithovirus siberiense

= Alphapithovirus =

Genus of viruses

Alphapithovirus is a genus of giant virus known from two species, Alphapithovirus siberiense, which infects amoebae, and Alphapithovirus massiliense. It is DNA-based and is a member of the nucleocytoplasmic large DNA viruses clade. It was discovered in 2014, when a viable specimen was found in a 30,000-year-old ice core harvested from permafrost in Siberia, Russia. It is the third-largest known giant virus, behind only Megaklothovirus horridgei and Klothovirus casanovai.

== Description ==
The genus name Alphapithovirus, a reference to large storage containers of ancient Greece known as pithoi, was chosen to describe the new species. A specimen of Alphapithovirus measures approximately 1.5 μm (1,500 nm) in length and 0.5 μm (500 nm) in diameter, making it one of the largest viruses yet found, behind only Megaklothovirus and Klothovirus in size. At the time of its discovery in 2014, the Pithovirus was the largest known virus by diameter. It is 50% larger in size than the Pandoraviridae, the previous largest-known viruses, and is larger than Ostreococcus, the smallest eukaryotic cell, although Pandoravirus has the largest viral genome, containing 1.9 to 2.5 megabases of DNA.

Alphapithovirus has a thick, oval wall, with an opening at one end. Internally, its structure resembles a honeycomb.

The genome of Alphapithovirus contains 467 distinct genes, more than a typical virus, but far fewer than the 2556 putative protein-coding sequences found in Pandoravirus. Thus, its genome is far less densely packed than any other known virus. Two-thirds of its proteins are unlike those of other viruses. Despite the physical similarity with Pandoravirus, the Alphapithovirus genome sequence reveals that it is barely related to that virus, but more closely resembles members of Marseilleviridae, Megaviridae, and Iridoviridae. These families all contain large icosahedral viruses with DNA genomes. The Alphapithovirus genome has 36% GC-content, similar to the Megaviridae, in contrast to greater than 61% for pandoraviruses. The family Orpheoviridae and genus Alphaorpheovirus, the family Pithoviridae and genus Alphapithovirus, and the family Cedratviridae and genus, Alphacedratvirus, has now been ratified by the ICTV.

=== Replication ===
The Alphapithovirus genome is one circular, double-stranded DNA (dsDNA) chromosome of about 610,000 base pairs (bp), encoding approximately 467 open reading frames (ORFs), which translate into 467 different proteins. The genome encodes all the proteins needed to produce mRNA; these proteins are present in the purified virions. Viral entry is initiated by attachment of virions to cells, leading to internalization, and uncoating to release genetic material for replication and propagation. Alphapithovirus therefore undergoes its entire replication cycle in its host's cytoplasm, rather than the more typical method of taking over the host's nucleus.

== Discovery ==
Alphapithovirus sibericum was discovered in a 30,000-year-old sample of Siberian permafrost by Chantal Abergel and Jean-Michel Claverie of Aix-Marseille University. The virus was discovered buried 30 m (100 ft) below the surface of a late Pleistocene sediment. Called Pithovirus sibericum, it belongs to a class of giant viruses that were discovered 10 years ago. It was found when riverbank samples collected in 2000 were exposed to amoebas. The amoebas started dying and, when examined, were found to contain giant virus specimens. The authors said they got the idea to probe permafrost samples for new viruses after reading about an experiment that revived a similar aged seed of Silene stenophylla two years earlier. The Alphapithovirus findings were published in the Proceedings of the National Academy of Sciences in March 2014.

Although the virus is harmless to humans, its viability after being frozen for millennia has raised concerns that global climate change and tundra drilling operations could lead to previously undiscovered and potentially pathogenic viruses being unearthed. However, other scientists dispute that this scenario poses a real threat.

A modern species in the genus, Alphapithovirus massiliense, was isolated in 2016. The core features such as the order of ORFs and orphan genes (ORFans) are well conserved between the two known species.

== Evolution ==
The rate of mutation of the genome has been estimated to be 2.23 × 10^{−6} substitutions/site/year. The authors have suggested that the two known Alphapithoviruses diverged around two hundred thousand years ago. The recently identified fish alphaviruses salmon pancreas disease virus and sleeping disease virus appear to be variants or subtypes of a new alphavirus species.

== See also ==
- DNA virus
- Largest organisms
- Lists of virus taxa
- Microbiology
- Virology
- Virus classification
