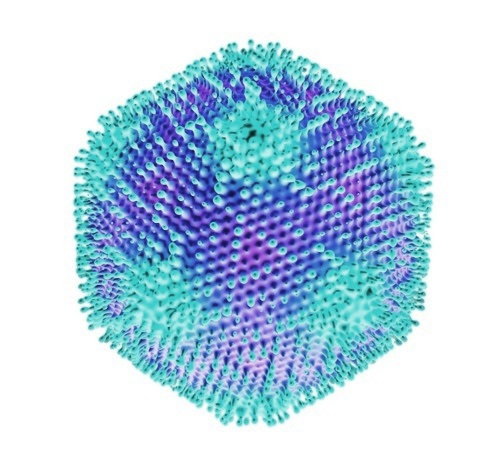
- 3D reconstruction of the "Medusavirus" particle showcases its thousands of external spikes

Virus classification
- (unranked): Virus
- Realm: Varidnaviria
- Kingdom: Bamfordvirae
- Phylum: Nucleocytoviricota
- Class: Megaviricetes
- Family: Mamonoviridae
- Genus: Medusavirus

= Medusavirus =

Genus of viruses

Medusavirus is a genus of nucleocytoplasmic large DNA viruses that is the sole representative of Mamonoviridae (from mamono (魔物), the Japanese word for "monster" in reference to Megaviricetes + -viridae). It was first isolated from a Japanese hot spring in 2019. It notably encodes all five types of histones—H1, H2A, H2B, H3, and H4—which are involved in DNA packaging in eukaryotes, raising the possibility that they may have been involved in the origin of eukaryotes. The virus can harden amoebae of the species Acanthamoeba castellanii into stone-like cysts, but infection usually causes infected amoebas to burst open. The virus was named after Medusa, the monster in Greek mythology whose gaze turned people to stone.

== Taxonomy ==
Medusavirus is a part of a phylum called Nucleocytoviricota, which is referred as nucleocytoplasmic large DNA virus (NCLDV). These viruses have a large double-stranded DNA genome and the length of the genome could be more than 100kb. NCLDV infects various eukaryotic hosts such as amoebas.

The genus contains two species:

- Medusavirus medusae
- Medusavirus sthenus

== Morphology ==
Viral particle is composed of icosahedral capsid which is 260 nm in diameter. This 8 nm single layered capsid is covered with 14 nm spherical-headed spikes. Viral double-stranded DNA is backed inside the 6 nm thick internal membrane.

== Maturation ==
Medusaviruses have a unique viral particle maturation process compared to several other viruses. Virus does not form viral factory in the host cytoplasm to replicate the viral genome. The proposed maturation process starts by generating the pseudo-Empty viral particles with the help of scaffold proteins. Then these pseudo-Empty particles release the scaffold proteins and Empty particles are formed. After the release of proteins the Empty particle uptakes the viral DNA near the host nucleus and via semi-Full stages the Full particles are eventually formed.
