= KNV (disambiguation) =

KNV most commonly refers to Klosneuvirus, a type of giant virus first identified in Austria

KNV can also refer to:

- Karbi National Volunteers, a terrorist group in India that merged with another to form United People's Democratic Solidarity
- Tabo language, a language of Papua New Guinea (iso-639-3 code: KNV)
