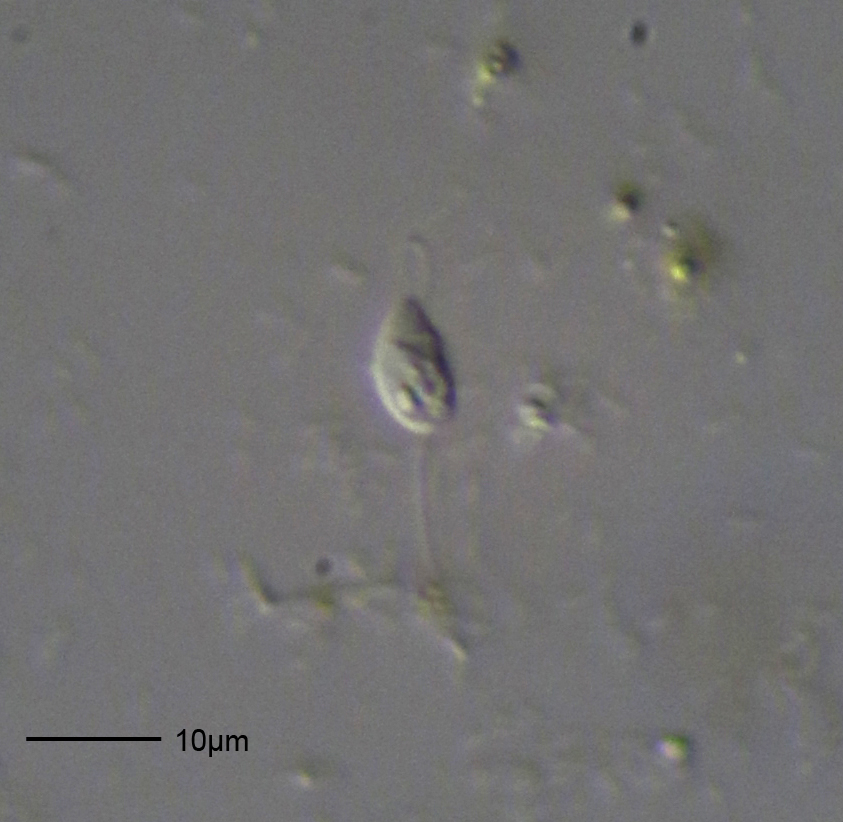
- Bodo saltans

Scientific classification
- Domain: Eukaryota
- Clade: incertae sedis
- Clade: Discoba
- Phylum: Euglenozoa
- Class: Kinetoplastea
- Order: Eubodonida
- Family: Bodonidae
- Genus: Bodo
- Species: B. saltans

Binomial name
- Bodo saltans Ehrenberg

Synonyms
- Pleuromonas jaculans

= Bodo saltans =

Species of kinetoplastid flagellated phagotrophic protozoa

Bodo saltans (alternatively known as Pleuromonas jaculans) is a free-living nonparasitic species of kinetoplastid flagellated phagotrophic protozoa that feed on bacteria. Bodo saltans cells have been reported in freshwater and marine environments.

Bodo saltans is a single-celled bean-shaped organism 4 to 5 micrometers in length. It has two flagella: a short anterior projecting flagellum and a longer posterior-projecting flagellum without hairs (acronematic) that extends beyond the length of the cell. B. saltans secures itself to the substrate of its aquatic habitat by the tip of a posterior flagellum. Flexing of the posterior flagellum results in a twitching, jumping movement that is characteristic of this species. This type of movement appears similar to the undulating membrane of the sexually transmitted pathogen Trichomonas vaginalis and can result in a false-positive diagnosis in cases where B. saltans is a contaminant in test samples, especially if a nonsterile saline solution has been used.

Phylogenetic analysis of the mitochondrial RNA editing process and inferred protein sequences in B. saltans appear to show that B. saltans diverged early on from the evolutionary line of kinetoplastids and that this species of bodonid is more closely related to the trypanosomatids than at least two species of parasitic bodonids of the genus Cryptobia.

Analysis based on the sequence of the topoisomerase II (topo II) gene provides evidence that B. saltans is a predecessor of the trypanosomatids. Commonly, the molecules of mitochondrial DNA in eukaryotes are circular and replication and transcription result in topological stress that is mitigated by enzymes called topoisomerases. Kinetoplastids possess a single mitochondrion with what is perhaps the most complex network of mitochondrial "kDNA" in small and large circular forms. As a consequence, mitochondrial genes for topoisomerases are available in high quantities that make it an attractive focus of genetic study. It is also the significance of the enzyme class of topoisomerases to the function of kinetoplastids that makes the topo genes a target for the medical treatment of trypanosomal and leishmanial diseases.

In one phylogenetic tree, the parasitic kinetoplastids included two separate groups of species – C. helicis and Trypanoplasma borreli in one group and the trypanosomatids in the other. The non-parasitic free-living B. saltans and B. uncinatus were distributed among the two groups, which implies that the bodonids such as B. saltans, may not have been predecessors of the parasitic species. Other studies show that the trypanosomatids evolved relatively late among the kinetoplastids and constitute a monophyletic group, but that the bodonids may be paraphyletic.

The species is known for being infected by a giant virus, the Bodo saltans virus, a member of the Mimiviridae family.

== Bibliography ==
- Klaus Hänel (January 1979). "Systematik und Ökologie der farblosen flagellaten des abwassers". Archiv für Protistenkunde (in German). 121 (1–2): 73–137. doi:10.1016/S0003-9365(79)80010-X. ISSN 0003-9365. Wikidata Q124499790.
- Hausmann, Klaus; Hulsmann, Norbert; Radek, Renate; Protistology (3rd Edition) 2003. E. Scheizerbart'sche Verlagsbuchhandlung.
- Lee, W. J.; Patterson, D.J. (1998). "Diversity and Geographic Distribution of Free-Living Heterotrophic flagellates". Protist. 149 (3): 229–243. doi:10.1016/s1434-4610(98)70031-8. PMID 23194636., updated with data from Al Qassab et al. (2002).
- Naja Vørs (September 1992). "Heterotrophic Amoebae, Flagellates and Heliozoa from the Tvärminne Area, Gulf of Finland, in 1988–1990". Ophelia (in German). 36 (1): 1–109. doi:10.1080/00785326.1992.10429930. ISSN 0078-5326. Wikidata Q104116089.
