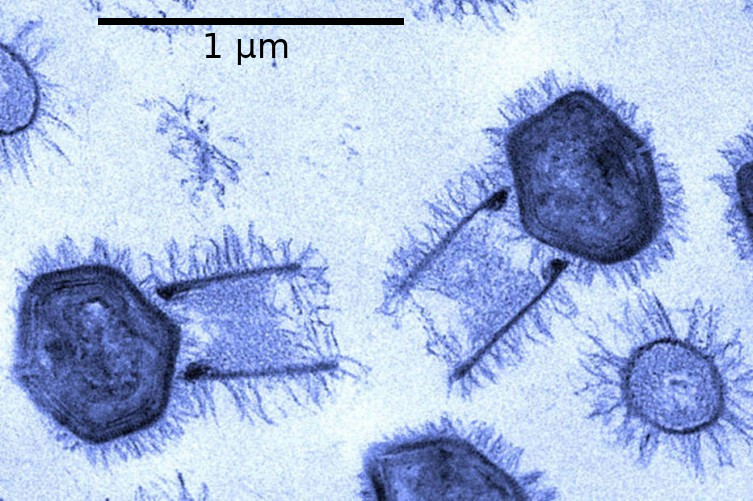
- Tupanvirus

Virus classification
- (unranked): Virus
- Realm: Varidnaviria
- Kingdom: Bamfordvirae
- Phylum: Nucleocytoviricota
- Class: Megaviricetes
- Order: Imitervirales
- Family: Mimiviridae

Subfamilies and genera
- See text

= Mimiviridae =

Family of viruses

Mimiviridae is a family of viruses. Amoeba and other protists serve as natural hosts. The family contains three subfamilies that contain ten genera. Viruses in this family belong to the nucleocytoplasmic large DNA virus clade (NCLDV), also referred to as giant viruses.

== History ==
The first member of this family, Mimivirus, was discovered in 2003, and the first complete genome sequence was published in 2004. However, the mimivirus Cafeteria roenbergensis virus was isolated and partially characterized in 1995, although the host was misidentified at the time, and the virus was designated BV-PW1.

== Taxonomy ==
The family contains the following subfamilies and genera (-virinae denotes subfamily and -virus denotes genus):

- Aliimimivirinae
  - Rheavirus
- Klosneuvirinae
  - Catovirus
  - Fadolivirus
  - Theiavirus
  - Yasminevirus
- Megamimivirinae
  - Cotonvirus
  - Megavirus
  - Mimivirus
  - Moumouvirus
  - Tupanvirus

== Structure ==
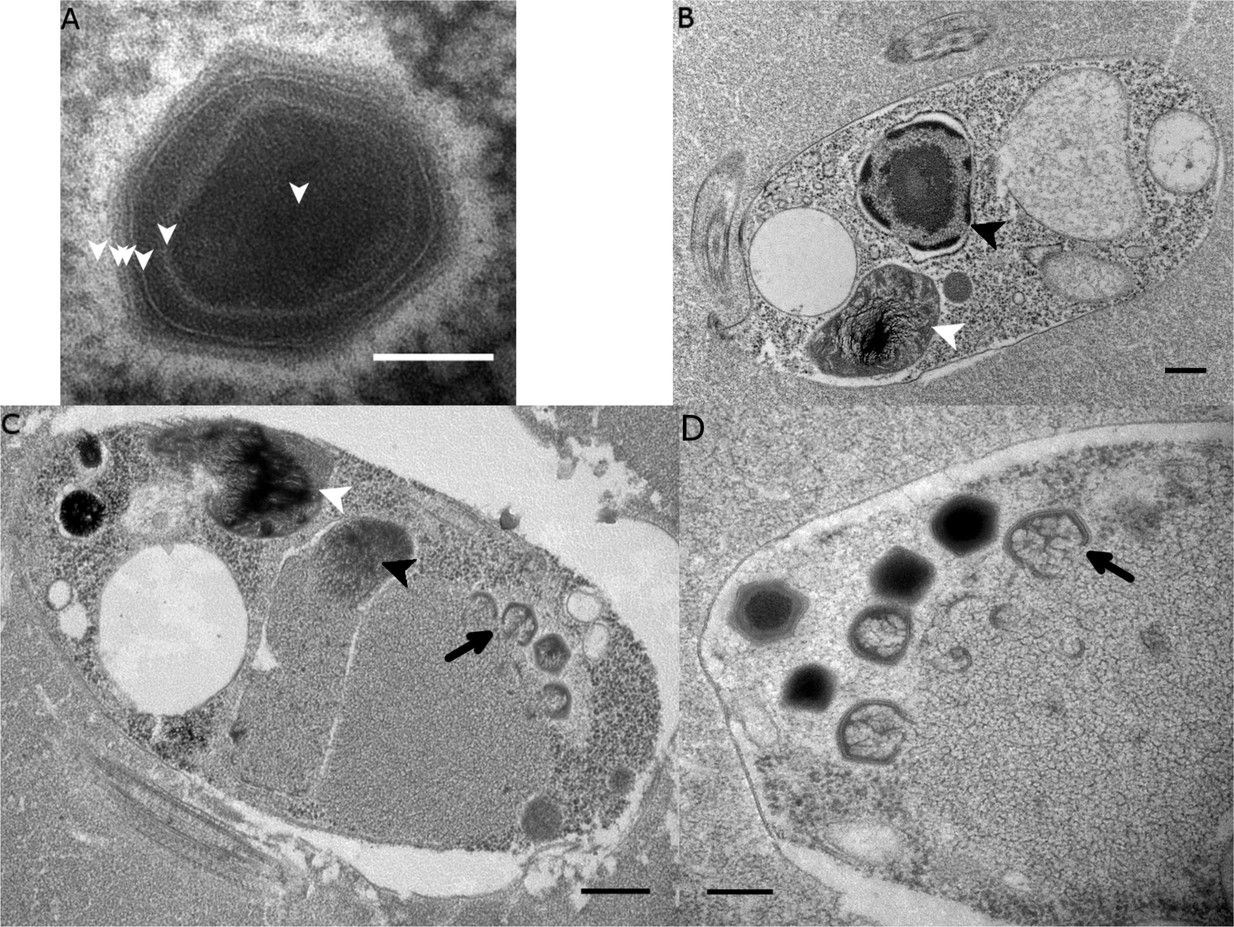
Ultrastructure of Bodo saltans virus particles and its replication

Viruses in Mimiviridae have icosahedral and round geometries, with between T=972 and T=1141, or T=1200 symmetry. The diameter is around 400 nm, with a length of 125 nm. Genomes are linear and non-segmented, around 1200kb in length. The genome has 911 open reading frames.

== Life cycle ==
Replication follows the DNA strand displacement model. DNA-templated transcription is the method of transcription. Amoeba serve as the natural host.

== Molecular biology ==
Three putative DNA base excision repair enzymes were characterized from Mimivirus. The base excision repair (BER) pathway was experimentally reconstituted using the purified recombinant proteins uracil-DNA glycosylase (mvUDG), AP endonuclease (mvAPE), and DNA polymerase X protein (mvPolX). When reconstituted in vitro mvUDG, mvAPE and mvPolX function cohesively to repair uracil-containing DNA predominantly by long patch base excision repair, and thus these processes likely participate in the BER pathway early in the Mimivirus life cycle.

== Clinical ==
Mimiviruses have been associated with pneumonia but their significance is currently unknown. The only virus of this family isolated from a human to date is LBA 111. At the Pasteur Institute of Iran (Tehran), researchers identified mimivirus DNA in bronchoalveolar lavage (BAL) and sputum samples of a child patient, utilizing real-time PCR (2018). Analysis reported 99% homology of LBA111, lineage C of the Megavirus chilensis. With only a few reported cases previous to this finding, the legitimacy of the mimivirus as an emerging infectious disease in humans remains controversial.

Mimivirus has also been implicated in rheumatoid arthritis. Specifically, Mimivirus collagen is hypothesized to trigger an autoimmunity to human collagen.

== See also ==
- Virophage
- Catovirus
- Hokovirus
- Indivirus
- Klosneuvirus
