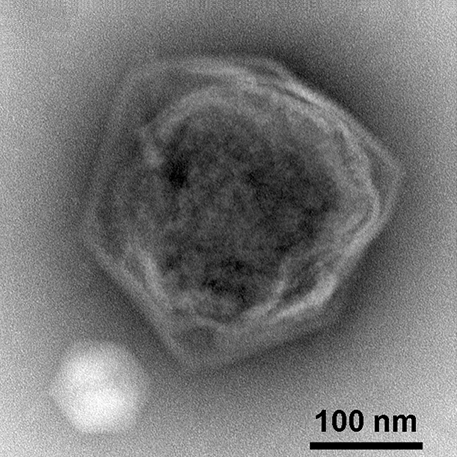
- The giant virus CroV with its virophage Mavirus at the lower left

Virus classification
- (unranked): Virus
- Realm: Varidnaviria
- Kingdom: Bamfordvirae
- Phylum: Nucleocytoviricota
- Class: Megaviricetes
- Order: Imitervirales
- Family: Mimiviridae
- Subfamily: Aliimimivirinae
- Genus: Rheavirus
- Species: Rheavirus sinusmexicani

= Cafeteria roenbergensis virus =

Rheavirus sinusmexicani

Species of virus

Cafeteria roenbergensis virus (CroV), scientific name Rheavirus sinusmexicani, is a giant virus that infects the marine bicosoecid flagellate Cafeteria roenbergensis, a member of the microzooplankton community.

== History ==
The virus was isolated from seawater samples collected from the Gulf of Mexico during 1989 to 1991, on a flagellate host that was misidentified as belonging to the genus Bodo; hence the original designation of the virus as BV-PW1. The virus was shown to be about 300 nm in diameter and have a complex internal structure, as well as evidence of a putative tail-like structure. Further work on the virus indicated that the host was an isolate of the genus Cafeteria and that the genome had a G+C content of ~34%. Further analysis suggested that the helicase of the virus was phylogenetically related to those found in the family Asfarviridae, and that the virus shared properties with members of the nucleocytoplasmic large DNA viruses group. CroV has one of the largest genomes of all marine viruses known, consisting of ~730,000 base pairs of double-stranded DNA. Among its 544 predicted protein-coding genes are several that are usually restricted to cellular organisms, such as translation factors and enzymes for DNA repair and carbohydrate synthesis. CroV is distantly related to Mimivirus and belongs to a group of viruses known as nucleocytoplasmic large DNA viruses. CroV is itself parasitized by a virophage named "Mavirus".

== Viral protein composition and structure ==
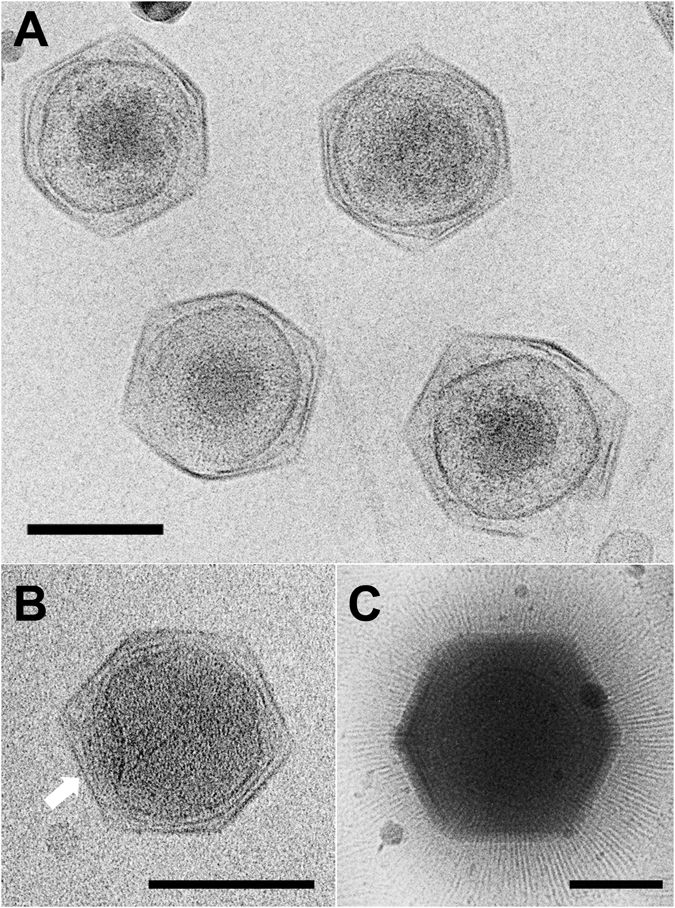
Cryo-EM images of CroV compared to APMV. (A) Cryo-electron micrograph of four CroV particles. (B) Single CroV particle with concave core depression (white arrow). (C) Single APMV particle. Scale bars in (A–C) represent 2,000 Å.

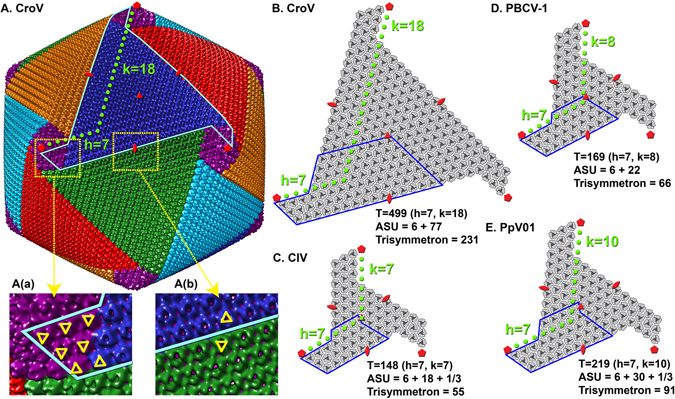
Cryo-EM reconstruction of the CroV virion and capsomer arrangements of other giant icosahedral viruses. (A) Reconstruction of the CroV capsid. The isosurface of the map was colored by pentasymmetrons (purple) and trisymmetrons (blue, red, green, cyan and orange). One of the 30 edges of the icosahedron is marked by a cyan line. Two surface areas (a,b) are magnified and selected capsomers are labeled by yellow triangles to show their orientations. (B–E) Isolated icosahedral faces of CroV, PBCV-1, CIV and PpV01 capsids are shown schematically. Their T-numbers, asymmetric unit capsomer numbers, and trisymmetron capsomer numbers are listed. 5-fold, 3-fold, and 2-fold symbols are indicated in red and ASUs are outlined in blue.

Viral protein composition includes 141 encoded proteins that have been identified in CroV, a number believed to be in close proximity to the entirety of the virion proteome. The virus packages several distinct groups of proteins, including a presumably complete base excision repair (BER) pathway. This is the most extensive DNA repair machinery that has yet been observed in a virus. It is also the first virus to be found with a mechanosensitive ion channel protein, which may protect the genome from osmotic damage. Mature CroV consists of a 300 nm diameter outer protein shell with icosahedral symmetry, an underlying lipid membrane, and an inner core that contains the genome. Resolution of the virus structure by cryo-electron microscopy yielded an icosahedral virus capsid with a T number of 499 and a new model for capsid assembly for giant viruses.

== Viral genome ==
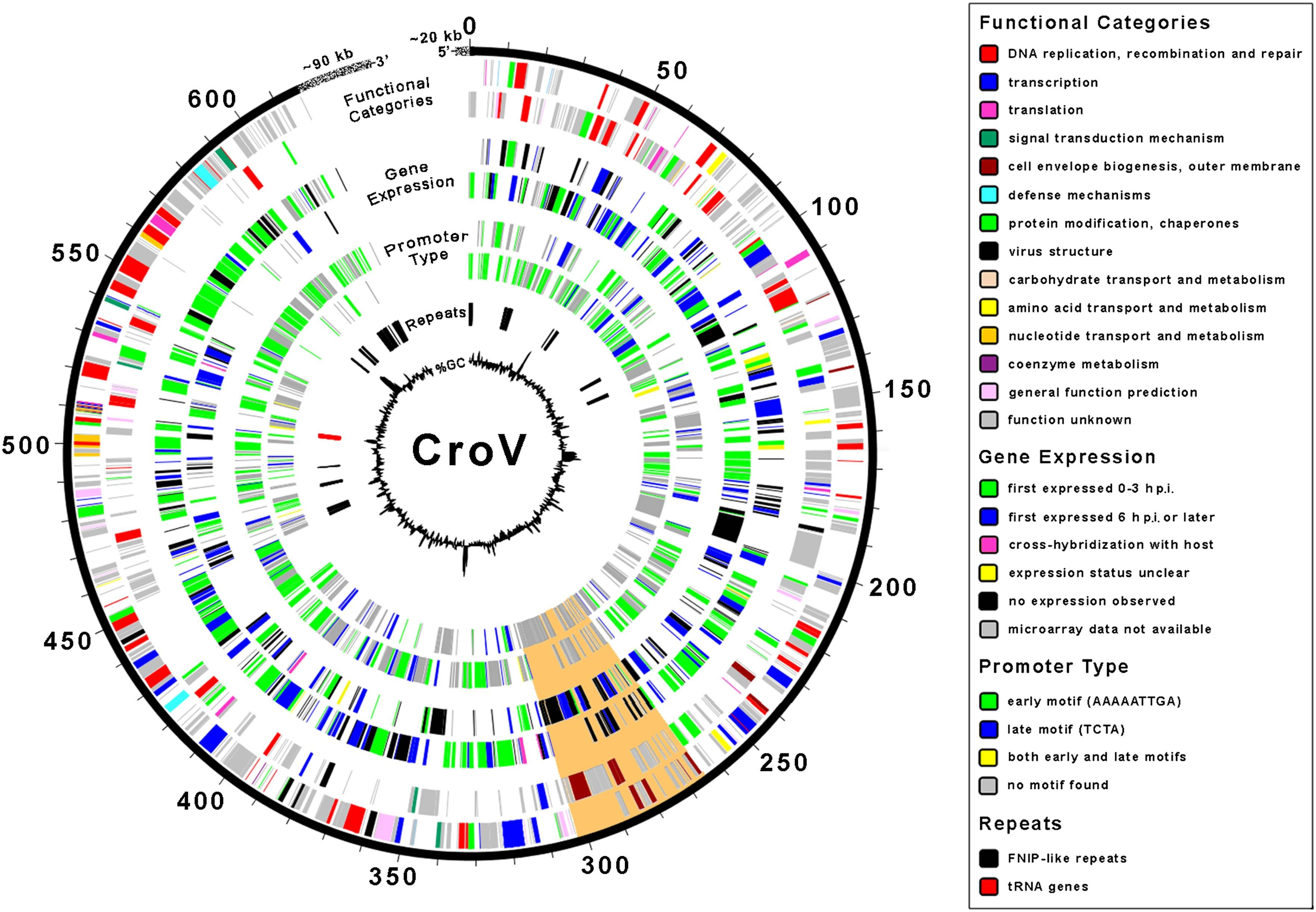
A diagram of CroV's genome, showing the functional categories of what the genome encodes for, when in the viral life the genes are expressed, the types of promoters, as well as the types of repeats.

CroV is the sole member of the genus Rheavirus in the family Mimiviridae within the proposed order Imitervirales. Phylogenetic analysis indicates that the virus is a nucleocytoplasmic large DNA virus (NCLD virus). Acanthamoeba polyphaga mimivirus is its closest known relative, although the two viruses share less than one-third of homologous genes.

The viral genome is primarily a 618,000 base pair strand flanked by large and highly repetitive repeats on both ends of the genome. These large caps are theorized to protect the ends of the protein-coding region, similar to telomeres in eukaryotes. Due to production of translational genes, like that of tRNA synthetase, the virus is able to modify and regulate host translational machinery that results in CroV being less dependent on host-cell components. 5% of the genome consists of repetitive elements that serve a yet unknown purpose. A region of 38,000 bases was observed that is believed to be involved with carbohydrate metabolism. The virus contains pathways that help assist in the biosynthesis of KDO (3-deoxy-d-manno-octulosonate). The presence and expression of 10 genes involved in glycoprotein synthesis were identified, suggesting that CroV is able to potentially partake in virion-cell recognition.

CroV also encodes several other interesting proteins. It encodes an entire biosynthetic pathway for the creation of 3-Deoxy-D-manno-oct-2-ulosonic acid, or KDO, which is a component of the cell walls of gram-negative bacteria. It also encodes two different photolyases, which repair DNA damage from UV radiation. CroV also encodes proteins that can carry out ubiquitination, which is a post-translational modification of proteins that functions in cellular signaling.

== Viral replication ==
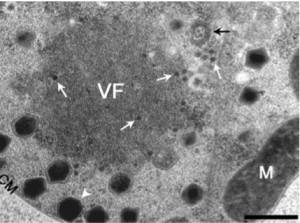
VF is the “virus factory,” where replication of CroV occurs. The white arrowhead indicates newly formed CroV particles. The white long-stem arrows indicate mavirus, a virophage that infects CroV.

Viral reproduction occurs in large constructs known as large cytoplasmic factories or viral factories. This is the site where DNA replication, transcription, and particle assembly are thought to take place. These factories are also the primary targets of the virophage Mavirus, which utilizes CroV machinery to replicate. Mavirus is a 19,000 kb circular double stranded DNA virus. Maviral infection reduces host cell death by interfering with CroV infection and replication. Mavirus integrates into the genome of cells of Cafeteria roenbergensis, and thereby confers immunity to the population.

CroV enters cells via phagocytosis. Once inside the cell, the CroV capsid disassembles and the viral proteins and genome are released. CroV does not use the transcription or translation machinery of the host cell. It remains in the cytoplasm, where a “virus factory” forms and replicates independent of the host cell nucleus. The CroV genome is not integrated into the host cell genome. CroV encodes eight subunits of DNA-dependent RNA polymerase and it also encodes at least six transcription factors, which allows the DNA genome to be transcribed into mRNA without the use of the cell’s proteins. CroV can then translate the mRNAs into proteins with help of the cell's translation machine and by using its own tRNA synthetase, tRNA, and translation initiation factors to fine-tune the translation to its own advantage.

== Host interaction ==
CroV infects Cafeteria roenbergensis, which is a marine zooflagellate. CroV is fatal to the host cell. This impacts coastal ecology because Cafeteria roenbergensis feeds on bacteria found in the water. When there are low numbers of Cafeteria roenbergensis due to extensive CroV infections, the bacterial populations rise exponentially.
