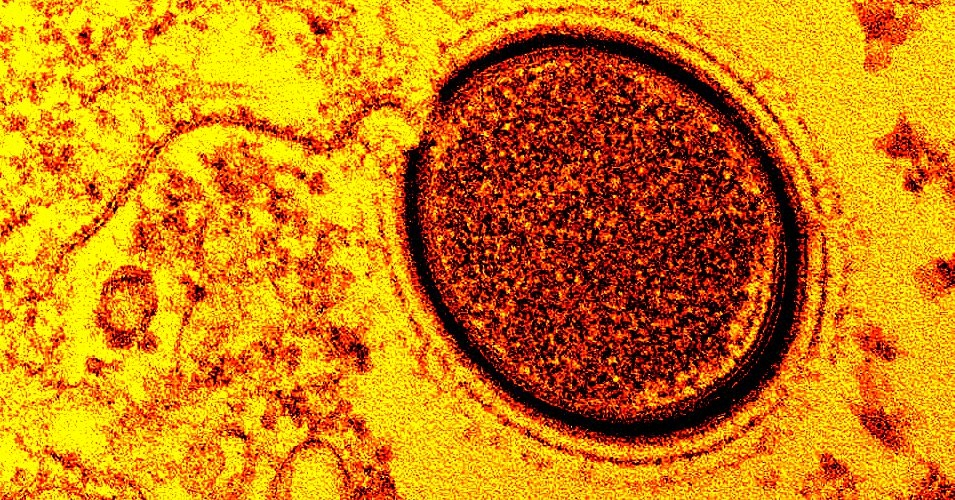

Virus classification
- (unranked): Virus
- Genus: Mollivirus
- Species: Mollivirus sibericum

= Mollivirus sibericum =

Proposed virus species

Mollivirus sibericum is a giant virus discovered in 2015 by French researchers Chantal Abergel and Jean-Michel Claverie in a 30,000-year-old sample of Siberian permafrost, where the team had previously found the unrelated giant virus Alphapithovirus sibericum. Mollivirus sibericum is a spherical DNA virus with a diameter of 500–600 nanometers (0.5–0.6 μm).

Mollivirus sibericum is the fourth ancient virus that scientists have found frozen in permafrost since 2003. It has a sister taxon, Mollivirus kamchatka.

== Description ==
Mollivirus sibericum is an approximately spherical virion 0.6 μm in diameter. It encloses a 651 kb GC-rich genome encoding 523 proteins, of which 64% are open reading frames. The host's ribosomal proteins are packaged in the virion.
