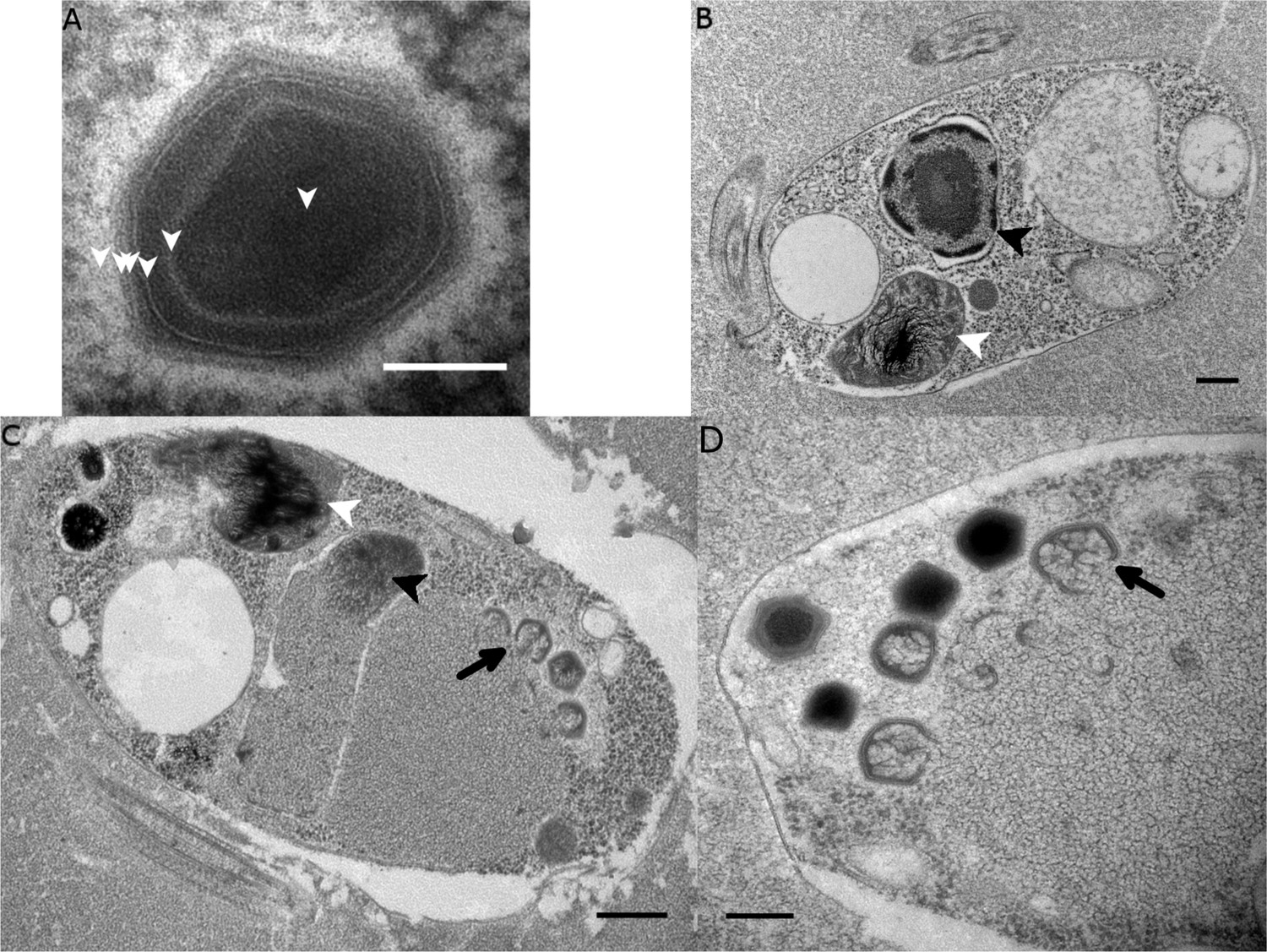
- (A) shows a mature BsV virion. (B) shows a healthy Bodo saltans cell. (C) and (D) show a post-infection state, assembly, and maturation of the virus inside a Bodo saltans cell.

Virus classification
- (unranked): Virus
- Realm: Varidnaviria
- Kingdom: Bamfordvirae
- Phylum: Nucleocytoviricota
- Class: Megaviricetes
- Order: Imitervirales
- Family: Mimiviridae
- Species: Theiavirus salishense

= Bodo saltans virus =

Theiavirus salishense

Species of virus

Theiavirus salishense, the Bodo saltans virus is a giant virus of the Mimiviridae family that infects the protozoa Bodo saltans. It has a genome of 1.39 megabases, one of the largest known viral genomes.

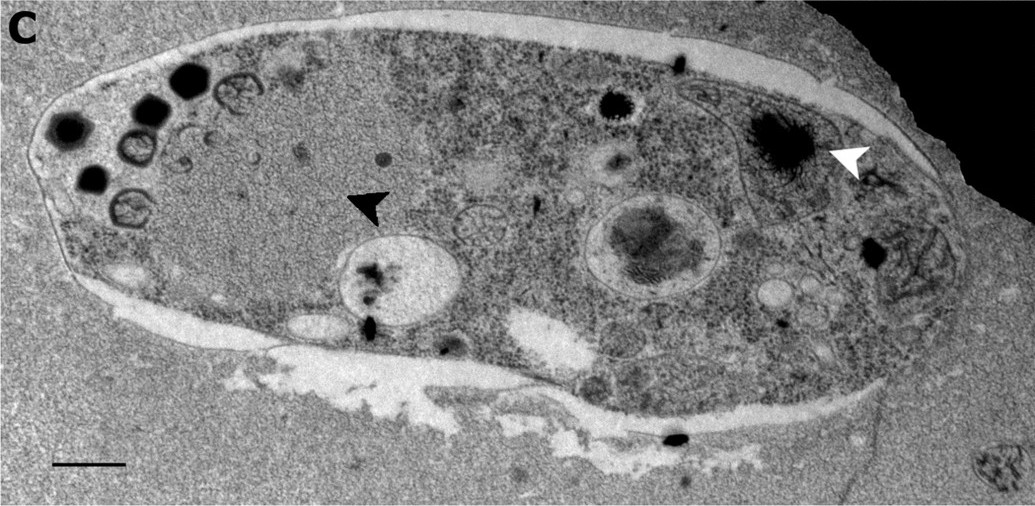
Bodo saltans cell 24 hr post-BsV infection showing degraded intracellular structures and a BsV virus factory (black arrow head).
