= Non-cellular life =

Life that has no cellular structure

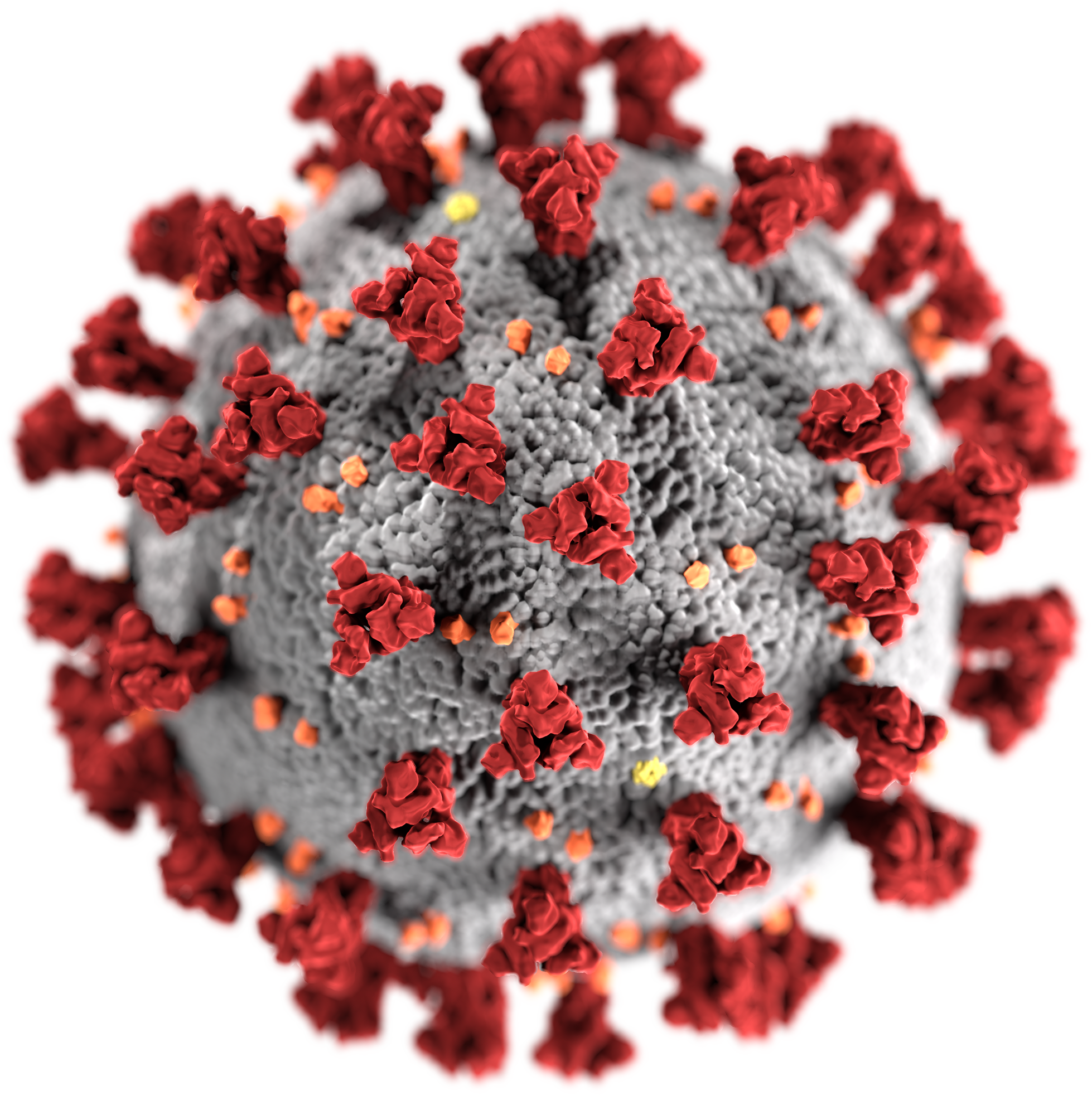
An illustration produced by the CDC of the ultrastructure of a SARS-CoV-2 virus as viewed using electron microscopy

Non-cellular life, also known as acellular life, is life that exists without a cellular structure for at least part of its life cycle. Historically, most definitions of life postulated that an organism must be composed of one or more cells, but, for some, this is no longer considered necessary, and modern criteria allow for forms of life based on other structural arrangements.

== Nucleic acid-containing infectious agents ==
=== Viruses ===
Types of virus

Researchers initially described viruses as "poisons" or "toxins", then as "infectious proteins"; but they possess genetic material, a defined structure, and the ability to spontaneously assemble from their constituent parts. This has spurred extensive debate as to whether they should be regarded as fundamentally biotic or abiotic—as very small biological organisms or as very large biochemical molecules. Without their hosts, they are not able to perform any of the functions of life—such as metabolism, growth, or reproduction. Since the 1950s, many scientists have thought of viruses as existing at the border between chemistry and life; a gray area between living and nonliving.

=== Viroids ===
If viruses are borderline cases or nonliving, viroids are further from being living organisms. Viroids are some of the smallest infectious agents, consisting solely of short strands of circular, single-stranded RNA without protein coats. They are only known to infect flowering plants, of which some are of commercial importance. Viroid genomes are extremely small in size, ranging from 246 to 467 nucleobases. In comparison, the genome of the smallest viruses capable of causing an infection are around 2,000 nucleobases in size. Viroid RNA does not code for any protein. Its replication mechanism hijacks RNA polymerase II, a host-cell enzyme normally associated with synthesis of messenger RNA from DNA, which instead catalyzes "rolling circle" synthesis of new RNA using the viroid's RNA as a template. Some viroids are ribozymes, having catalytic properties which allow self-cleavage and ligation of unit-size genomes from larger replication intermediates.

A possible explanation of the origin of viroids sees them as "living relics" from a hypothetical, ancient, and non-cellular RNA world before the evolution of DNA or of protein. This view, first proposed in the 1980s, regained popularity in the 2010s to explain crucial intermediate steps in the evolution of life from inanimate matter (abiogenesis).

=== Obelisks ===
In 2024, researchers announced the possible discovery of viroid-like, but distinct, RNA-based elements dubbed obelisks. Obelisks, found in sequence databases of the human microbiome, are possibly hosted in gut bacteria. They differ from viroids in that they code for two distinct proteins, dubbed "oblins", and for the predicted rod-like secondary structure of their RNA.

== First universal common ancestor ==
The first universal common ancestor (FUCA) is an example of a proposed non-cellular lifeform, as it is the earliest ancestor of the last universal common ancestor, its sister lineages, and every currently living cell.

== See also ==
- Carbon chauvinism
- Virus classification
- Virus-like particle
- Hypothetical types of biochemistry
- Nanobe
- Plasmid
- Pre-cell
- Prion
- Protocell
- List of subviral agents
