= Nanobe =

Rock and sediment microstructure

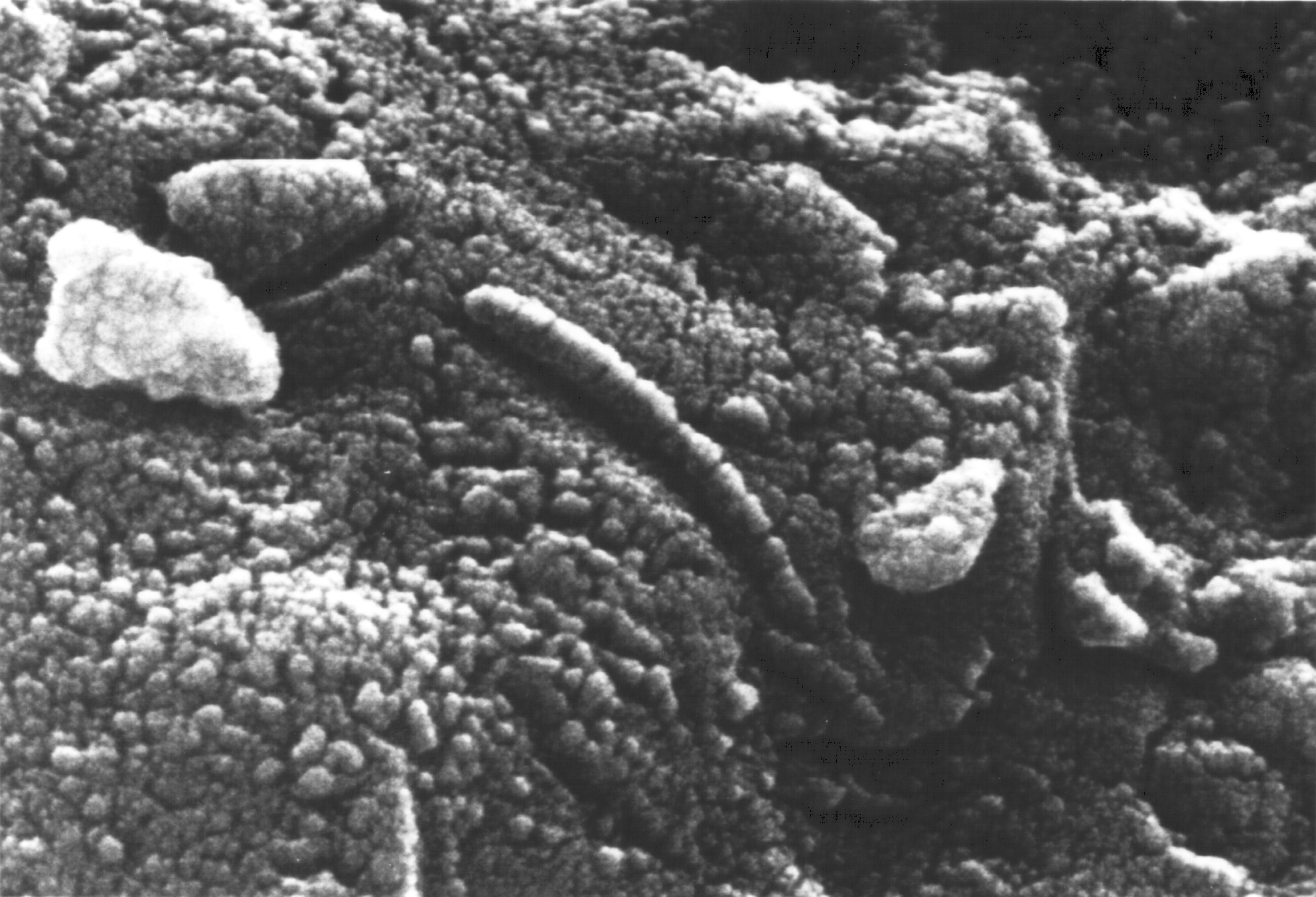
Structures found in the ALH84001 meteorite are similar to the structures found in nanobes

A nanobe (/ˈnænoʊb, ˈneɪnoʊb/) is a tiny filamental structure that was found in some rocks and sediments by a research team in 1996. When they were discovered, some scientists hypothesized that nanobes were the smallest form of life. However, after the original research was published in 1998, no further research reports have been published about nanobes. They are one-tenth the size of the smallest known bacteria. There is no conclusive evidence that these structures are living organisms.

The 1996 discovery of nanobes was published in 1998 by Uwins et al., from the University of Queensland, Australia. They were found in rock samples (both full-diameter and sidewall cores) of Jurassic and Triassic sandstones, originally retrieved from an unspecified number of oil exploration wells off Australia's west coast. Depths of retrieval were between 3,400 metres (2.1 mi) and 5,100 metres (3.2 mi) below the sea bed. Uwins et al. do not exclude the possibility that the nanobes are from a surface contaminant.

The smallest are just 20 nanometers in diameter. Some researchers believe that these structures are crystal growths, although these structures can be stained with dyes that bind to DNA.

They are similar to the structures found in ALH84001, a Mars meteorite found in the Antarctic. A 2022 study concluded that ALH84001 did not contain Martian life; the discovered organic molecules were found to be associated with abiotic processes (ie, "serpentinization and carbonation reactions that occurred during the aqueous alteration of basalt rock by hydrothermal fluids") produced on the very early Mars four billion years ago instead.

== Claims ==
Nanobes are about 20 nm in diameter, which appears to be too small to contain the basic elements for an organism to exist (DNA, ribosomes, etc.). The Martian meteorite ALH84001, discovered in 1984 in the Antarctic, contained similar tubular structures which some astrobiologists suggested could be evidence of life at an earlier time on Mars.

== Responses ==
A review in Microbes and Environments of the various ultra-small forms of proposed life states that the main criticism of nanobes is that they appear too small to contain the biochemical machinery needed to sustain life. The review also states that there is no evidence that nanobes are organisms in themselves and not fragments of larger organisms.

Tony Taylor was one of the authors of the original nanobe paper. He argues that the conspicuous lack of phosphorus in the X-ray spectroscopy data and the failure to find DNA using various DNA amplification techniques demonstrates that nanobes do not have any DNA or RNA.

== Size scale context ==
Sizes of micro-organisms and infectious agents
Agent	Description	Size (nm)
Megaklothovirus horridgei	largest known virus	3,900 nm
Pandoravirus	one of the largest known viruses	1,000 nm
Nanoarchaeum	smallest known archaeon	400 nm
Mycoplasma	smallest known bacterium	300 nm
Nanobacteria	nonliving crystal structures	< 200 nm
Parvovirus	smallest known viruses	18–28 nm
Nanobes	hypothetical lifeforms smaller than viruses	≈20 nm
Prion	smallest known infectious agent (protein)	≈10 nm

== See also ==
- Smallest organisms
- Protocell
