= Giant Virus Finder =

- Developer(s): Csaba Kerepesi
- Written in: Perl, Python
- Operating system: Linux
- Available in: English
- Type: Bioinformatics
- License: GNU General Public Licence
- Website: http://pitgroup.org/giant-virus-finder

The Giant Virus Finder is a free bioinformatics software for finding giant viruses in metagenomes.

== Applications ==
The Giant Virus Finder tool integrates and applies the Giant Virus Toplist, the list of the largest virus genomes. With the tool, giant viruses were found in diverse habitats, like the Great Rann of Kutch or the Mojave Desert, the Prairie, or the Antarctic dry valleys.
