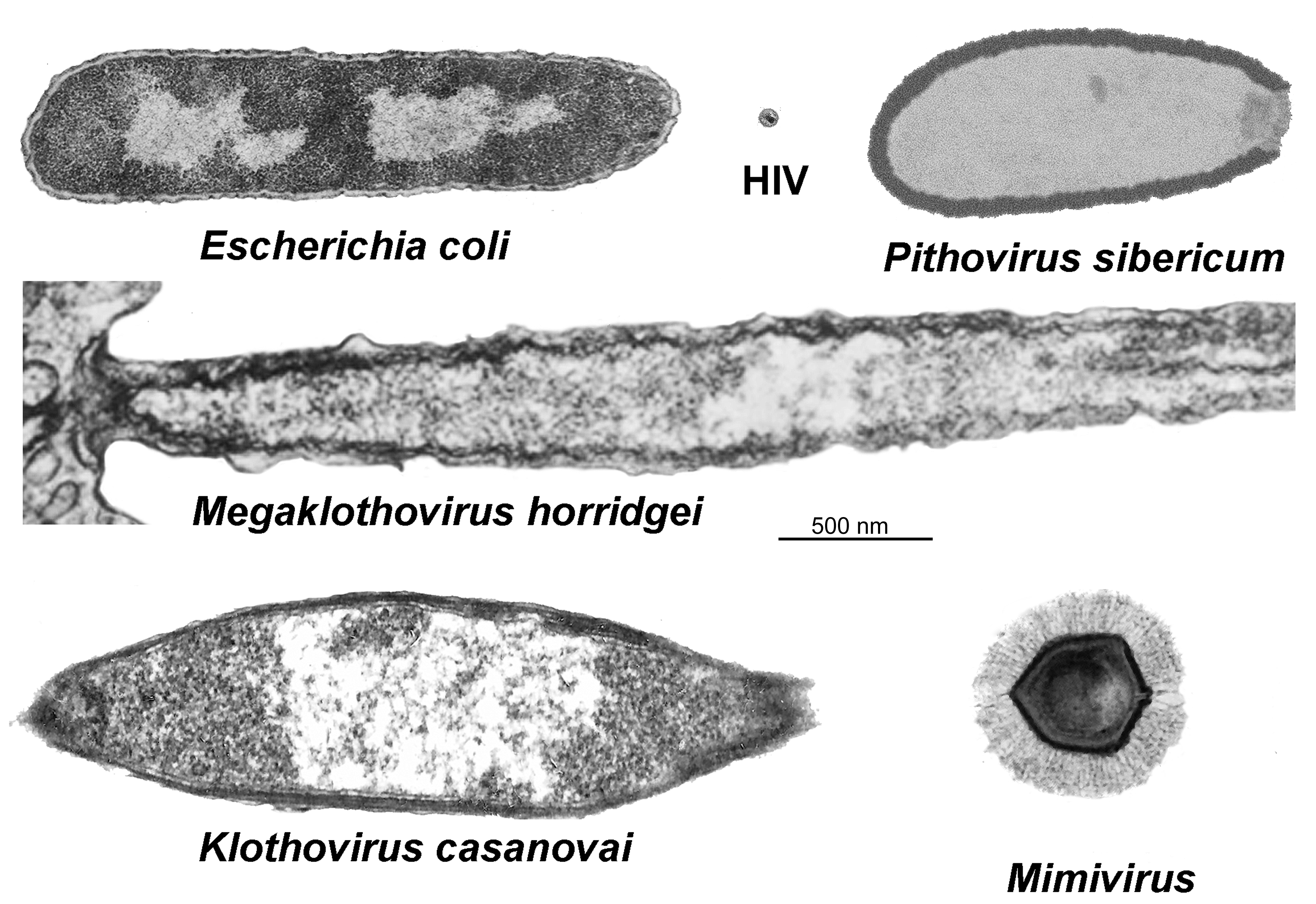
- Megaklothovirus horridgei compared to HIV and E. coli

Virus classification
- Group: Virus
- Family: Klothoviridae
- Genus: Megaklothovirus
- Species: Megaklothovirus horridgei

= Megaklothovirus horridgei =

Largest virus ever discovered

Megaklothovirus horridgei is the largest virus ever discovered. It is 3.9 μm long, which is about twice the length of an Escherichia coli bacterium. It was first discovered in 2018 on an arrow worm of the genus Spadella that it was infecting. Before Megaklothovirus horridgei was understood to be a giant virus, it had been mistaken for bristles in 1967, and later for bacteria in 2003.

== Name ==
Megaklothovirus horridgei is named in tribute to Adrian Horridge, the author of the 1967 article in which the viruses were mistaken for bristles.

== See also ==
- DNA virus
- Largest organisms
