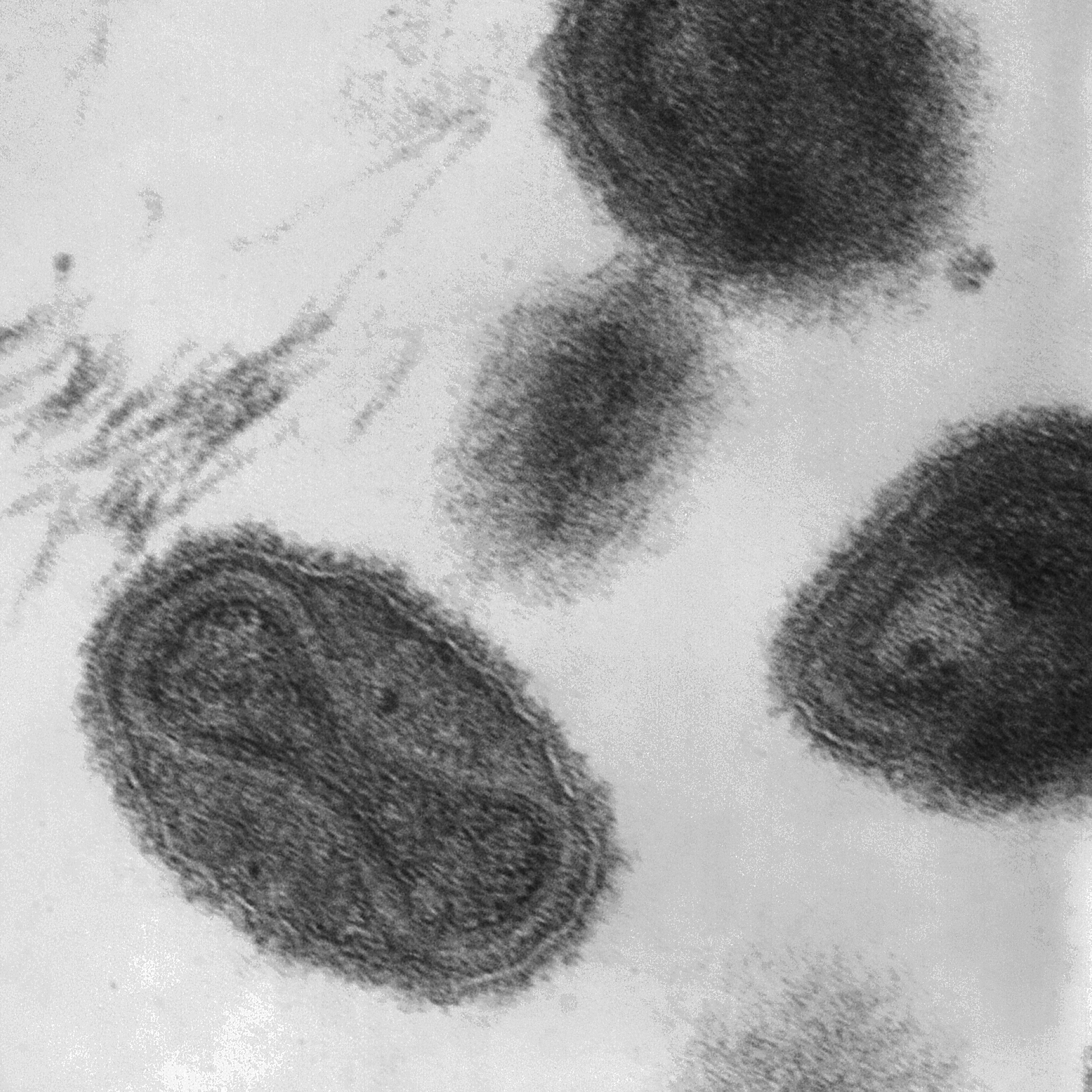
- Transmission electron micrograph (TEM) of smallpox virus virions, at magnification of approximately 370,000x.

Virus classification
- (unranked): Virus
- Realm: Varidnaviria
- Kingdom: Bamfordvirae
- Phylum: Nucleocytoviricota

Classes
- See text

Synonyms
- Megavirales

= Nucleocytoviricota =

Phylum of viruses

Nucleocytoviricota is a phylum of viruses. Members of the phylum are also known as the nucleocytoplasmic large DNA viruses (NCLDV), which serves as the basis of the name of the phylum with the suffix -viricota for virus phylum. These viruses are referred to as nucleocytoplasmic because they are often able to replicate in both the host's cell nucleus and cytoplasm.

The phylum is notable for containing the giant viruses. There are nine families of NCLDVs that all share certain genomic and structural characteristics; however, it is uncertain whether the similarities of the different families of this group have a common viral ancestor. One feature of this group is a large genome and the presence of many genes involved in DNA repair, DNA replication, transcription, and translation. Typically, viruses with smaller genomes do not contain genes for these processes. Most of the viruses in this family also replicate in both the host's nucleus and cytoplasm, thus the name nucleocytoplasmic.

There are 47 NCLDV core genes currently recognised. These include four key proteins involved in DNA replication and repair: the enzymes DNA polymerase family B, the topoisomerase II A, the Flap endonuclease and the processing factor proliferating cell nuclear antigen. Other proteins include DNA dependent RNA polymerase II and transcription factor II B.

== Taxonomy ==
Nucleocytoviricota contains the following classes:

- Megaviricetes
- Mriyaviricetes
- Pokkesviricetes

== Hosts ==
Host organisms typically include protozoa, invertebrates and eukaryotic algae. The class Pokkesviricetes infects familiar vertebrates, including multiple farm animals and humans.

Phylogenetic tree of phylum Nucleocytoviricota on base of Subramaniam et al. (2020).

== Examples ==
=== Ascoviridae ===
Order Pimascovirales. Members of the family Ascoviridae come in different shapes. Some can be rod-shaped, while others are oval. They measure up to 130 nm wide and 400 nm long. These viruses have circular double stranded DNA that have a length of about 100–200 kilobase pairs. They infect lepidopteran insect larvae and can infect through parasitoid wasps. Once they infect they replicate and cause death in insect pest. Ascoviridae can have up to 180 genes in its genome. The replication of this virus takes place in the nucleus of the host cell. When it replicates, it causes the nucleus to increase in size and eventually burst. After, the virion starts to form and spread.

=== Asfarviridae ===
Order Asfuvirales. A member of the family Asfarviridae is known as an Asfarvirus. This virus is the cause of African swine fever. Some of the symptoms for this flu include fever, high pulse, fast breathing, and it can cause death. These symptoms can be similar to those from hog cholera, the difference is that the African swine flu can not be cured. There is no vaccine developed to fight this virus.

=== Iridoviridae ===
Order Pimascovirales. The Iridoviridae have linear double stranded DNA genomes up to 220 kilobases long and can code for about 211 proteins. The capsid of this virion is icosahedral shaped and can be up to 350 nm wide. The replication cycle of this virus begins in the nucleus of the host and end in the cytoplasm. Some viruses of this family are often found infecting fish and amphibians while other are found in insect and crustaceans. The Andrias davidianus ranavirus (ADRV), a member of the family Iridoviridae, encodes a protein (Rad2 homolog) that has a key role in the repair of DNA by homologous recombination, and in double-strand break repair.

=== Marseilleviridae ===
Order Pimascovirales. The Marseilleviridae viruses have double stranded DNA genomes that are about 368 kilobases long. Members of the family can have about 457 open reading frames (ORFs) in its genome. The host organisms are amoebae. Once it infects, viral replication takes place in virus factories in the cytoplasm. It was found that the genome of the family Marseilleviridae codes for about 28 different proteins. The capsid of the Marseillevirus is about 250 nm wide with a geometry shape of an icosahedral. The replication of this virus usually occurs near the nucleus once it infects the amoeba. Once the virus infects it can cause a shape change in the host's nucleus.

=== Mimiviridae ===
Order Imitervirales. The Megaviridae contains some of the largest viruses ever discovered. They have linear double stranded DNA genomes with a length of 1,259,197 base pairs, which is larger than some small bacteria. Within this genome 1,100 proteins are coded. 74.76% of the base pairs are represented by thymine and adenine. The Megaviridae virus can be found infecting acanthamoeba or other protozoan clades. Once the virus infects the host, the replication cycle takes place in the cytoplasm. Within the genome, DNA repair enzymes can be found. These are used when the DNA is harmed such as when it is exposed to ionizing radiation or UV light. Three enzymes employed in DNA base excision repair were characterized from Mimivirus. The pathway of DNA base excision repair (BER) was experimentally reconstituted using the purified recombinant proteins AP endonuclease (mvAPE), uracil-DNA glycosylase (mvUDG), and DNA polymerase X protein (mvPolX). When reconstituted in vitro, mvAPE, mvUDG and mvPolX were found to function cohesively to repair uracil-containing DNA mainly by long patch base excision repair. Thus these processes likely participate in the BER pathway early in the Mimivirus life cycle. Cafeteria roenbergensis virus, a giant virus of the Mimiviridae family, also encodes enzymes for DNA repair.

Traditionally only these viruses have been grouped into a family Mimiviridae. Later it appeared that the viruses of the Organic Lake Phycodna Group (OLPG) are more related to Mimiviruses than to Phycodnaviruses. For this reason it has been proposed adding them to legacy Mimiviridae as new subfamily Mesomimivirinae in order to form the more comprehensive family Megaviridae. For this reason, the term Mimiviridae was used sensu lato synonymous with Megaviridae. However, since the ICTV has created a new order Imitervirales officially containing the (legacy) Mimiviridae, proposed Mesomimivirinae are proposed to be upgraded as a new family Mesomimiviridae, i.e. as sister family of legacy Mimiviridae (within this order).

=== Pandoraviridae ===
Possibly order Algavirales. Pandoraviridae were discovered in 2013 from a coastal water sample in Chile. It is mostly found infecting amoebae. It has a length of 1 micrometer long and 0.5 micrometer wide. Its genome can be up to 2.5 million base pairs long. The replication of this virus takes place in the cytoplasm. Like other giant viruses, it affects the host's nucleus and can take up to 15 hours to start infecting. Although it is found in water, it does not affect humans, it may actually help us by increasing the production of oxygen in aquatic environments.

=== Phycodnaviridae ===
Order Algavirales. The Phycodnaviridae are icosahedral in shape with a double-stranded DNA molecule. Some members of this family can have a linear double-stranded DNA while others have a circular double stranded DNA. The genome has been found to be up to 560 kilobases in length. Up to 50% of the DNA can be represented by guanine or cytosine. This virus is known to infect algae, which means it is found in the ocean.

=== Pithoviridae ===
Order Pimascovirales. The Pithoviridae have only two known representatives. These viruses infects amoebas and can survive in low temperatures. Pithovirus sibericum was isolated from permafrost soil from Siberia, where it had remained frozen but viable for more than 30,000 years. This is a double stranded DNA virus with its size being 610 kilobases long. The genome is estimated to code for 467 open reading frames. The virion is rod shaped with a length of 1,100 nm long and 500 nm in diameter.

=== Poxviridae ===
Order Chitovirales. The Poxviridae have a linear double-stranded DNA molecule that can have a length of up to 230 kilobases. The replication of these viruses takes place in the cytoplasm. Smallpox, cowpox, and other pox viruses belong to this family.

=== Mininucleoviridae ===
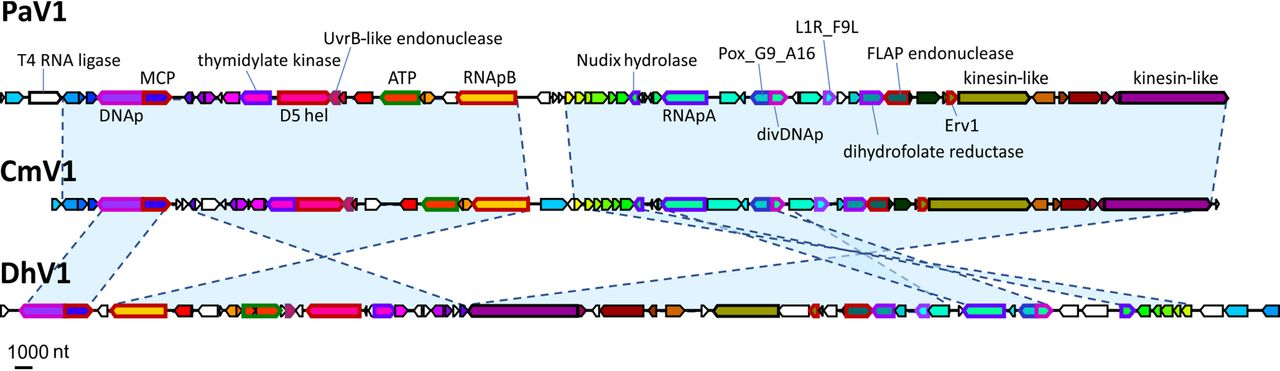
Genome maps of the crustacean viruses PaV1, DhV1 and CmV1 (proposed family Mininucleoviridae).

Possibly order Pimascovirales. A new family has been proposed—Mininucleoviridae—for a family of large viruses that replicate in crustacea. Members of this proposed family include Carcinus maenas virus 1 (CmV1), (Note: CmV1 infects Carcinus maenas) Dikerogammarus haemobaphes virus 1 (DhV1), (Note: DhV1 infects Dikerogammarus haemobaphes) and Panulirus argus virus 1 (PaV1). (Note: PaV1 infects Panulirus argus)

=== Unclassified taxa ===
- Cedratvirus – now under Pithoviridae (Pimascovirales)
- Choanovirus – part of extended Mimiviridae, a clade distinct from Mimiviridae proper; (Imitervirales)
- Dinodnavirus – now under Asfarviridae (Asfuvirales)
- Faustovirus – now under Asfarviridae (Asfuvirales)
- Kaumoebavirus – clusters under Asfarviridae (Asfuvirales)
- Klothovirus – no sequences available
- Megaklothovirus – no sequences available
- Medusavirus – proposed to be its own family Medusaviridae, possibly close to Mollivirus or basal in Nucleocytoviricota
- Meelsvirus – no sequences available
- Mollivirus – close to Pandoravirus (Algavirales)
- Namao virus – (together with Faunusvirus sp. from metagenomics) close to Cafeteriavirus; possibly together with other Sturgeon-NCLDVs; (Imitervirales)
- Orpheovirus – likely under Pithoviridae; sister group to Cedratvirus (Pimascovirales)
- Pacmanvirus – likely under Asfarviridae (Asfuvirales)
- Platanovirus – similar to Megavirus or Tupanvirus (Imitervirales)
- Sissivirus and Misannotatedvirus – (together with Solumnvirus, Solivirus from metagenomics) possibly under Pithoviridae
- Tupanvirus – possibly under Mimiviridae (Imitervirales)
- Urceolovirus – possibly under Nucleocytoviricota
- Usurpativirus and Clandestinovirus – a clade possibly under Phycodnaviridae nearby Chlorovirus (Algavirales)
- Yasminevirus – close to Klosneuvirus and Bodo saltans virus; (together with Gaeavirus, Homavirus, Barrevirus, Fadolivirus, Dasosvirus, Edafovirus, Terrestrivirus, Harvfovirus, Hyperionvirus from metagenomics) members of Mimiviridae (Imitervirales)

== Phylogenetics ==
The general consensus is that Iridoviridae–Ascoviridae are closely related sister taxa in a clade. Pithovirus, Iridoviridae–Ascoviridae and Marseillevirus form a PIM or MAPI clade (Pimascovirales) in trees built from conserved proteins. The sister clade to PIM/MAPI is a clade made out of Algavirales (Phycodnaviridae, Pandoraviridae), and possibly Imitervirales/Mimiviridae ("P2" thereafter). Poxviridae is consistently treated as a basal branch. Asfarviridae is either a sister group to Poxviridae (building together Pokkesviricetes) or a member of the P2 clade. The ICTV classification, as of 2019, matches the general shape of the tree.

=== Evolutionary context ===
The NCLDVs are of interest in the study of eukaryogenesis, the origin of eukaryotes. This is because:

- Most have RNA polymerases (RNAPs) structurally similar to that of archaea and eukaryotes. Sequence comparison indicates that they fall into the same branch away from the archaea as the three eukaryotic RNAPs, while the clade that includes all NCLDV RNAPs also includes all eukaryotic RNAPs. The eukaryotic RNAPs I and II each branch with different families of NCLDV. This suggests that the divergence of NCLDV RNAPs predated the divergence of eukaryotic RNAPs I and II, which could mean that NCLDV families diverged before the last common ancestor of living eukaryotes (LECA).
- Some of them have histone genes that are more similar to the eukaryotic ones than to the archaeal ones, divisible into the four classes of H2A, H2B, H3, H4. Their characteristics are intermediary between the two. Their phylogenetic pattern (for each group) is suggestive of multiple acquisitions from stem-eukaryotes during eukaryogenesis: for each of the groups, the eukaryotic examples form a clade under the larger clade of NCLDV examples.

In other words, they carry sequences that may have branched off from eukaryotes before the LECA, making them valuable lenses into the possible past. A more aggressive version of the idea is viral eukaryogenesis, which posits that eukaryotes appeared thanks to direct genetic contribution from viruses.

== Ecology ==
NCLDVs have a large influence on ecology (e.g. via controlling ocean blooms) and gene flow. NCLDVs can mediate horizontal gene transfer between eukaryotes and other organisms (another eukaryote, even a prokaryote).

== See also ==
- Viral eukaryogenesis
