= Giant virus =

Very large DNA virus

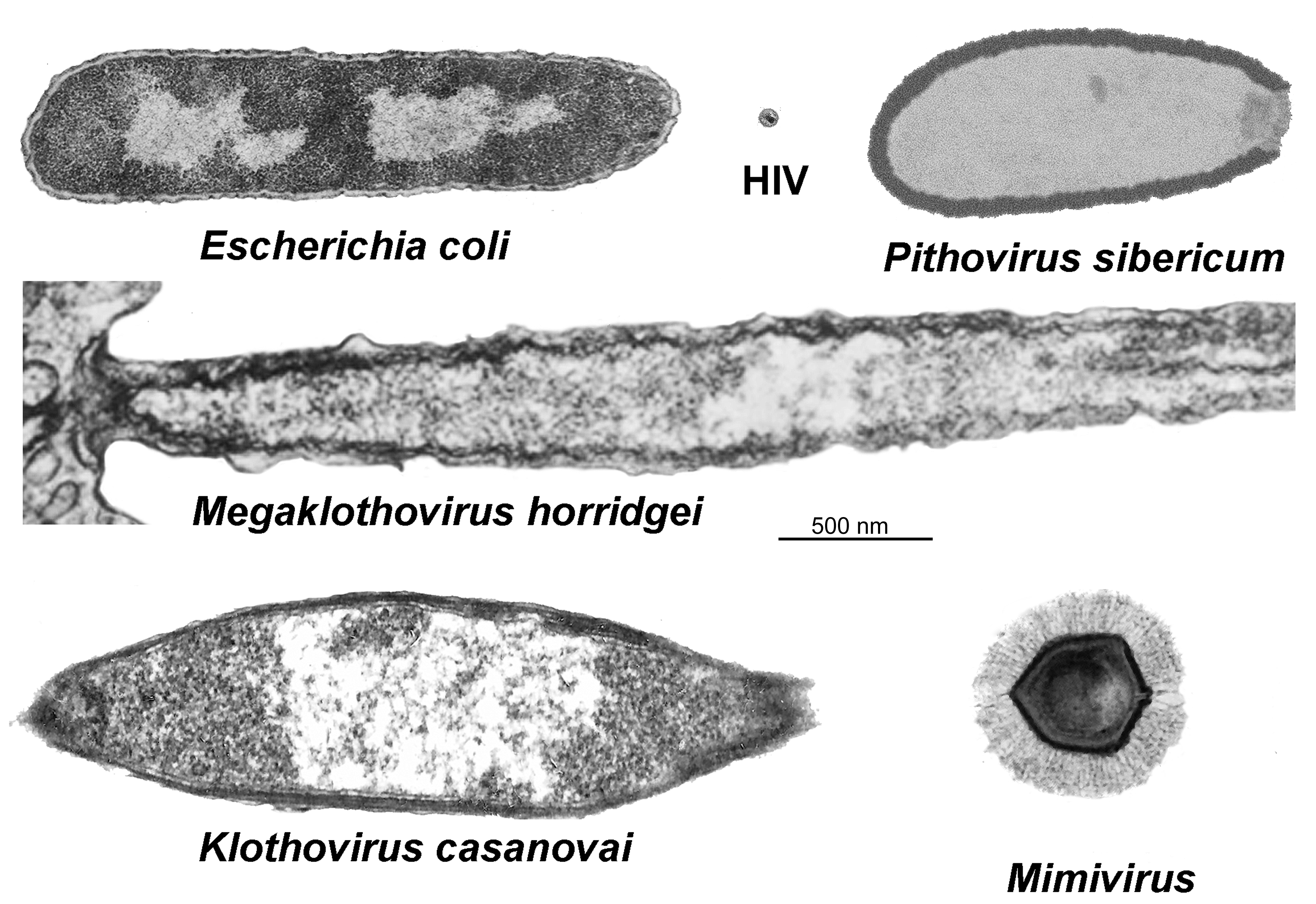
Several giant viruses (Megaklothovirus horridgei, Pithovirus sibericum, Klothovirus casanovai, and Mimivirus) compared to E. Coli bacterium and normal size virus (HIV)

A giant virus, sometimes referred to as a girus, is a very large virus, some of which are larger than typical bacteria. All known giant viruses belong to the phylum Nucleocytoviricota.

== Description ==
While the exact criteria used in the scientific literature varies, giant viruses are usually defined as those with virions larger than 200-300 nanometers in their smallest dimension (making them visible by light microscopy) and a genome size greater than 200-300 kb pairs. All known giant viruses belong to the Nucleocytoviricota, the nucleocytoplasmic large DNA viruses, meaning they are known to replicate in both the host cell nucleus and cytoplasm, and have large, double-stranded DNA genomes. Although all giant viruses belong to this phylum, they are not a monophyletic group, as some members of the Nucleocytoviricota, such as the genus Prasinovirus, are not giant viruses.

The large genomes of many giant viruses encode unusual genes that are not found in other viruses, including genes involved in glycolysis and the TCA cycle, fermentation, and the cytoskeleton. Giant viruses from the deep ocean, terrestrial sources, and human patients contain genes encoding cytochrome P450 enzymes. The origin of these P450 genes in giant viruses remains unknown, but they may have been acquired from an ancient host.

Giant viruses infect a large variety of eukaryotic hosts, such as amoebae, algae, lepidopterans, and humans, and are widely distributed in the natural environment. Giant viruses may also be further infected by virophages, the first of which was discovered in the co-infecting Acanthamoeba castellanii mamavirus (ACMV).

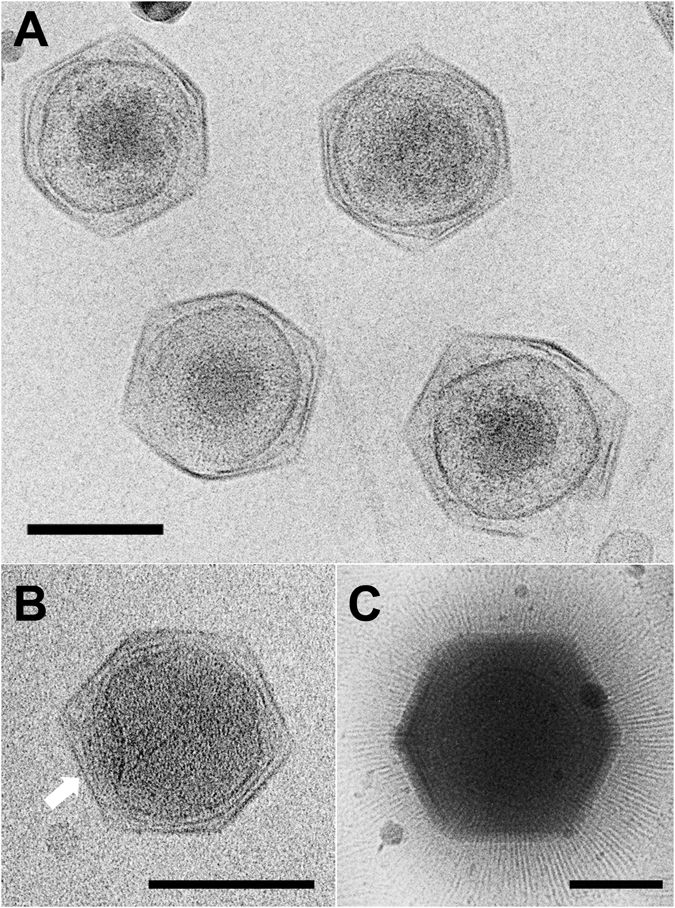
Cryo-EM images of the giant viruses CroV and APMV. (A) Cryo-electron micrograph of four CroV particles. (B) Single CroV particle with concave core depression (white arrow). (C) Single APMV particle. Scale bars in (A–C) represent 2,000 Å.

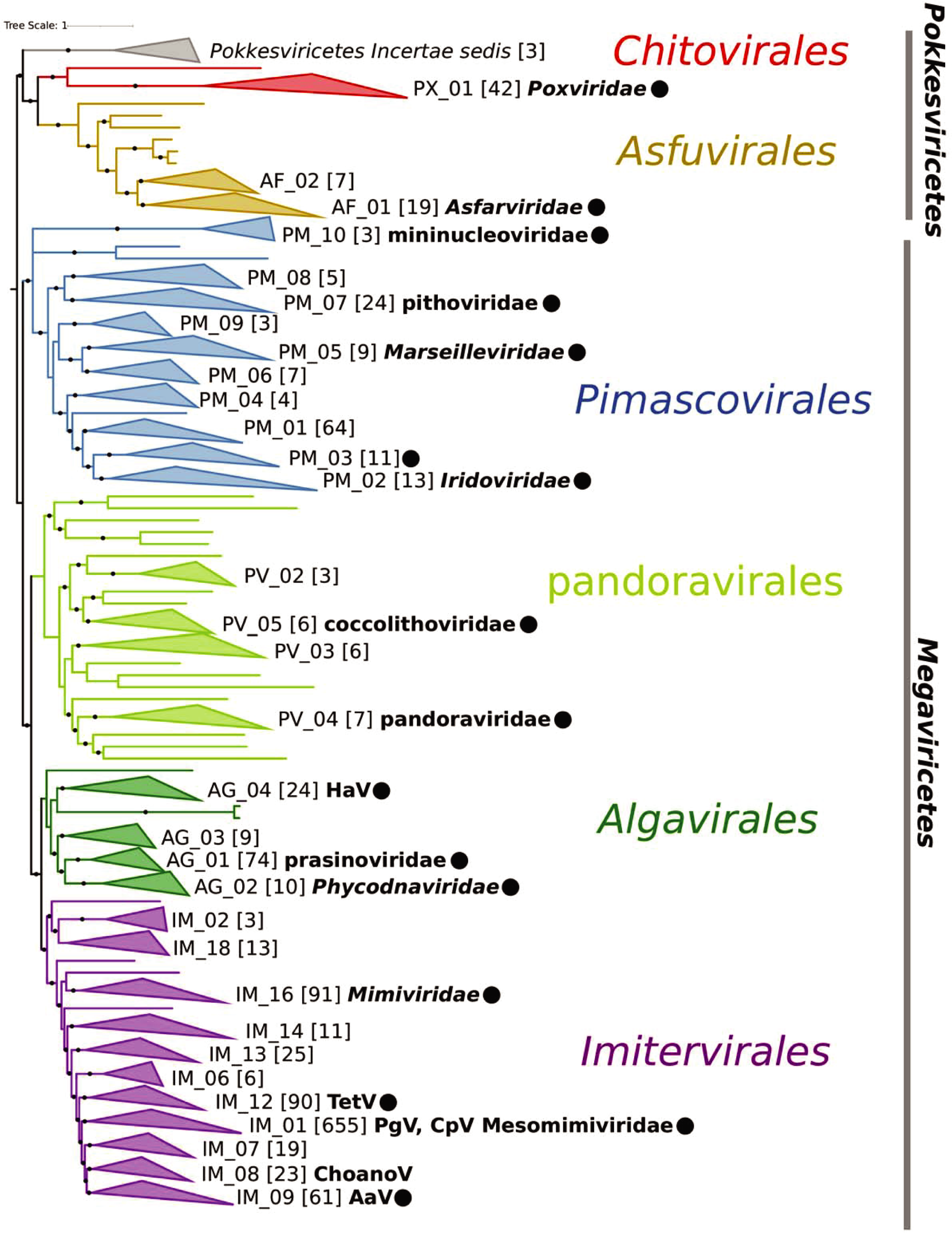
Phylogeny of Nucleocytoviricota

== History ==
The term 'giant virus' was coined in the late 1990s to describe Chloroviruses of the family Phycodnaviridae, which were found to have unusually large genomes. The first of these, Paramecium bursaria chlorella virus 1, was discovered in 1981 by Russel H. Meints, James L. Van Etten, Daniel Kuczmarski, Kit Lee, and Barbara Ang, and was initially called HVCV (Hydra viridis Chlorella virus) since it was first found to infect Chlorella-like algae living inside Hydra viridissima.

The term was further cemented in scientific literature after the characterization of Acanthamoeba polyphaga mimivirus (APMV) in 2003 and its genetic sequencing in 2004 that revealed its genome was 1.2 million base pairs long, larger than the sequenced genomes of many bacteria. It was initially discovered in 1992 infecting Acanthamoeba polyphaga and mistakenly identified as a gram-positive bacteria. The emerging concept of the 'giant' virus led to the term 'girus' being coined to refer to the group in 2006.

In 2008, the first virophage, Sputnik, was discovered parasitizing the Acanthamoeba polyphaga mimivirus (APMV), beginning a series of discoveries on giant virus parasitism. In 2011, Mavirus, which parasitizes the Cafeteria roenbergensis virus (CroV), was the first virophage found that was shown to be related to the large Maverick transposons or politons that are found in some eukaryotic cells. In 2013, mobile genetic elements with segments homologous to genes in virophages, called transpovirons, were found in the genomes of several Mimivirus strains.

Metagenomic samples of ocean water in the 2010s revealed that giant viruses are ubiquitous in the marine environment, where they have been found to infect marine microzooplankton. The first of these was described in 1995 as BV-PW1, found in seawater samples collected from 1989 to 1991, although its host was misidentified as belonging to the genus Bodo. The host was later correctly identified as being in the species Cafeteria roenbergensis in 2010, and the virus was renamed Cafeteria roenbergensis virus (CroV). Several years later, in 2018, the Bodo saltans virus with a genome size of ~1.4 Mb that infected an isolate of Bodo saltans was cultured from a freshwater pond, and related viruses were found to be widespread in marine waters.

Further notable discoveries include the largest known viral genome (~2.5 Mbp) of Pandoravirus salinus in 2013, the recovery of Pithovirus sibericum in a 30,000-year-old ice core in 2014, and the identification of the virus with the longest known virion, Megaklothovirus horridgei, in 2018.

== Genetics and evolution ==
The genomes of giant viruses are the largest known for viruses, and contain genes that encode for important elements of translation machinery, a characteristic that had previously been believed to be indicative of cellular organisms. These genes include multiple genes encoding a number of aminoacyl tRNA synthetases, enzymes that catalyze the esterification of specific amino acids or their precursors to their corresponding cognate tRNAs to form an aminoacyl tRNA that is then used during translation. The presence of four aminoacyl tRNA synthetase encoding genes in Mimivirus and Mamavirus genomes, both species within the Mimiviridae family, as well as the discovery of seven aminoacyl tRNA synthetase genes in the megavirus genome (including those in Mimiviridae) provide evidence that these large DNA viruses may have evolved from a shared cellular genome ancestor by means of genome reduction.

The discovery and subsequent characterization of giant viruses has triggered debate on their evolutionary origins. The two main hypotheses are that they evolved from small viruses by picking up DNA from host organisms; or that they evolved from very complicated organisms via genome reduction, losing various functions including self-reproduction. The possible complicated ancestral organism is also a topic of debate: by one proposal, it might represent a fourth domain of life, but this has been largely discounted. A molecular dating study shows that the divergence time of the last common ancestor of the giant viruses was within the last billion years, which is much younger than the origins of the known domains of life.

== Comparison of largest known giant viruses ==
Largest giant viruses with complete sequenced genomes as of June 2018
Giant virus name	Genome Length	Genes	Capsid diameter (nm)	Hair cover	Genbank #
Pandoravirus salinus	2,473,870	2500 proteins (predicted)	~500		KC977571
Tupanvirus	1,500,000	1276–1425 proteins	≥450+550		KY523104; MF405918
Bodo saltans virus	1,385,869	1227 proteins (predicted)	~300	yes (~40 nm)	MF782455
Megavirus chilense	1,259,197	1120 proteins (predicted)	440	yes (75 nm)	JN258408
Mamavirus	1,191,693	1023 proteins (predicted)	500	yes (120 nm)	JF801956
Mimivirus	1,181,549	979 proteins 39 non-coding	500	yes (120 nm)	NC_014649
M4 (Mimivirus "bald" variant)	981,813	756 proteins (predicted)	390	No	JN036606
Cafeteria roenbergensis virus	617,453 (730 kb)	544 proteins (predicted)	300	No	NC_014637

The whole list is in the Giant Virus Toplist created by the Giant Virus Finder software. As of June 11, 2018, there were 183 listed.

Specific common features among giant viruses
Giant virus name	Aminoacyl-tRNA synthetase	Octocoral-like ^{1}MutS	^{2}Stargate	Known virophage	Cytoplasmic virion factory	Host
Megavirus chilensis	7 (Tyr, Arg, Met, Cys, Trp, Asn, Ile)	yes	yes	no	yes	Acanthamoeba (Unikonta, Amoebozoa)
Mamavirus	4 (Tyr, Arg, Met, Cys)	yes	yes	yes	yes	Acanthamoeba (Unikonta, Amoebozoa)
Mimivirus	4 (Tyr, Arg, Met, Cys)	yes	yes	yes	yes	Acanthamoeba (Unikonta, Amoebozoa)
M4 (Mimivirus "bald" variant)	3 (Met, Cys, Arg)	yes	yes	Resistant	yes	Acanthamoeba (Unikonta, Amoebozoa)
Cafeteria roenbergensis virus	1 (Ile)	yes	no	yes	yes	Phagotrophic protozoan (Heterokonta, Stramenopiles)

^{1}Mutator S (MutS) and its homologs are a family of DNA mismatch repair proteins involved in the mismatch repair system that acts to correct point mutations or small insertion/deletion loops produced during DNA replication, increasing the fidelity of replication. ^{2}A stargate is a five-pronged star structure present on the viral capsid forming the portal through which the internal core of the particle is delivered to the host's cytoplasm.

== See also ==
- Cafeteria roenbergensis virus
- Klosneuvirus
- Mimivirus
- Nucleocytoviricota
- Pandoravirus
- Pithovirus
- Mamavirus
- Largest organisms
