= Imitervirales =

Virus classification
- (unranked): Virus
- Realm: Varidnaviria
- Kingdom: Bamfordvirae
- Phylum: Nucleocytoviricota
- Class: Megaviricetes
- Order: Imitervirales

Order of viruses

Imitervirales is an order of viruses.

== Taxonomy ==
The order contains the following suborders and families (-virineae denotes suborders and -viridae denotes families):

- Orthomivirineae
  - Mimiviridae
- Paramivirineae
  - Allomimiviridae
  - Mesomimiviridae
  - Schizomimiviridae
