= Megaviricetes =

Virus classification
- (unranked): Virus
- Realm: Varidnaviria
- Kingdom: Bamfordvirae
- Phylum: Nucleocytoviricota
- Class: Megaviricetes

Orders
- See text

Class of viruses

Megaviricetes is a class of viruses. The class contains giant viruses, all of which are nucleocytoplasmic large DNA viruses that are assigned to the phylum Nucleocytoviricota. Members of the Megaviricetes typically have genomes that are much larger than viruses assigned to other taxa, and also encode genes involved in DNA repair, DNA replication, transcription, translation, and other processes that viruses in other taxa usually lack. As well, the virus particles (virions) of some members of Megaviricetes are much larger in size than for other viruses, and can be larger than some bacteria.

== Orders ==
The following orders are recognized:

- Algavirales
- Imitervirales
- Pimascovirales

Additionally, the class contains one family unassigned to an order: Mamonoviridae.
