= Bamfordvirae =

Virus classification
- (unranked): Virus
- Realm: Varidnaviria
- Kingdom: Bamfordvirae

Subtaxa
- See text

Kingdom of viruses

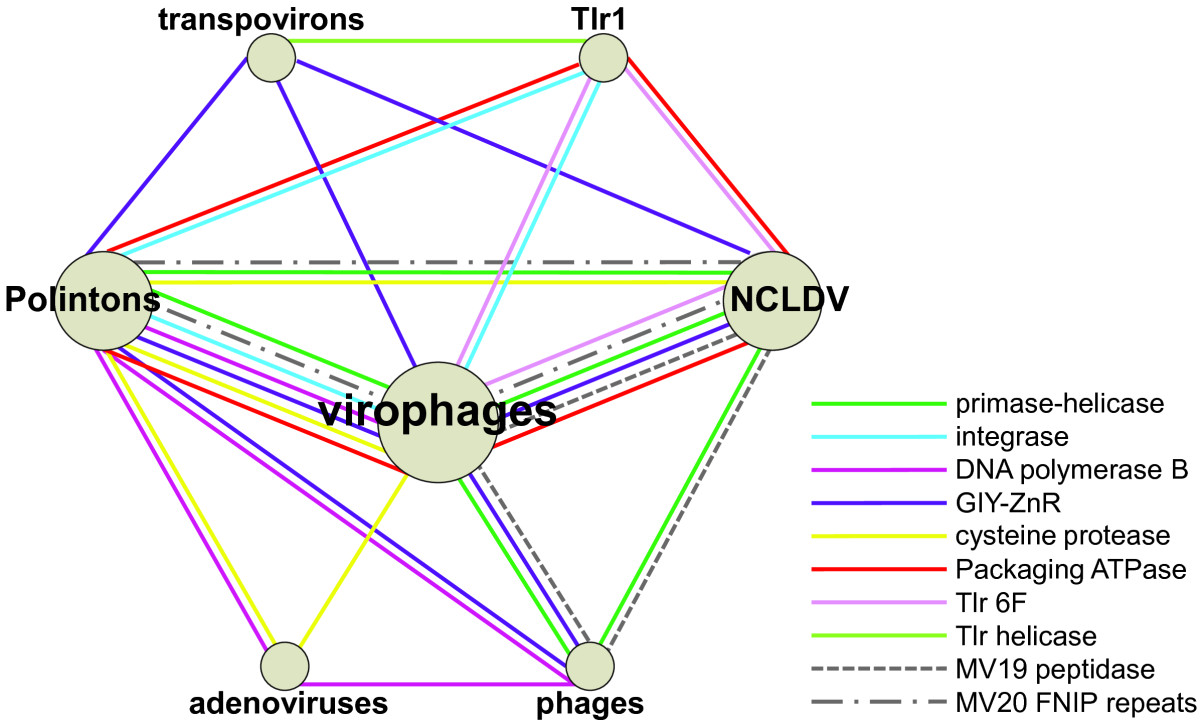
The genetic network linking various types of Bamfordvirae viruses and selfish genetic elements, represented by labeled circles. Links between circles are color-coded by the gene whose sequence homology establishes the link.

Bamfordvirae is a kingdom of viruses. This kingdom is recognized for its use of double jelly roll major capsid proteins. It was formerly known as the PRD1-adenovirus lineage. The kingdom is named after Dennis H. Bamford who first promoted the evolutionary unity of all viruses encoding double jelly-roll major capsid proteins.

== Taxonomy ==
Bamfordvirae contains the following phyla:

- Nucleocytoviricota
- Preplasmiviricota
