= Megalocytivirus =

Virus classification
- (unranked): Virus
- Realm: Varidnaviria
- Kingdom: Bamfordvirae
- Phylum: Nucleocytoviricota
- Class: Megaviricetes
- Order: Pimascovirales
- Family: Iridoviridae
- Subfamily: Alphairidovirinae
- Genus: Megalocytivirus

Genus of viruses

Megalocytivirus is a genus of viruses in the family Iridoviridae and one of three genera within this family which infect teleost fishes, along with Lymphocystivirus and Ranavirus. Megalocytiviruses are an emerging group of closely related dsDNA viruses which cause systemic infections in a wide variety of wild and cultured fresh and saltwater fishes. Megalocytivirus outbreaks are of considerable economic importance in aquaculture, as epizootics can result in moderate fish loss or mass mortality events of cultured fishes.

== Taxonomy ==
The family Iridoviridae is divided into seven genera, including Chloriridovirus, Iridovirus, Lymphocystivirus, Megalocytivirus, Daphniairidovirus, and Ranavirus. Megalocytivirus isolates exhibit relatively few genetic differences and have been divided into three major groups based on genetic sequence data; these groups are represented by infectious spleen and kidney necrosis virus (ISKNV), red sea bream iridovirus (RSIV), and turbot reddish body iridovirus (TRBIV). RSIV and ISKNV are the best known of the megalocytiviruses.

Song, et al. evaluated 48 Asian and Australian megalocytivirus isolates with regard to geographic location and genetic variation in the major capsid protein gene and developed a phylogenetic tree which divided the 48 isolates into three distinct clusters based on genotype. One of these clusters (genotype I) is widely distributed among several Asian countries, including 13 isolates from Korea, nine isolates from Japan, one from Thailand, one from China, and one from the South China Sea. In contrast, the other two genotypes had a smaller host range and were locally distributed. Genotype II megalocytiviruses infected freshwater fishes from Southeast Asia and Australia, whereas genotype III megalocytiviruses infected primarily flatfish in China and Korea.

Two species are official recognized by the International Committee on Taxonomy of Viruses, listed by scientific name and followed by the exemplar virus of the species:

- Megalocytivirus lates1, Scale drop disease virus
- Megalocytivirus spagrus1, Red seabream iridovirus

== Pathology ==
Infection with these viruses produces a characteristic presence of enlarged basophilic cells within infected organs.

== Structure and replication ==
Megalocytiviruses are large icosahedral DNA viruses measuring 150-250 nm in diameter with a large single linear dsDNA genome.

Megaloviruses are assumed to replicate in the same fashion as other Iridoviruses, and attach to the host cell and enter by receptor-mediated endocytosis. Uncoated viral particles subsequently translocate to the host cell nucleus, where a virally encoded DNA polymerase facilitates DNA replication. Viral DNA then leaves the nucleus of the host cell and a second stage of DNA replication occurs in the cytoplasm, forming DNA concatemers. A headful mechanism is utilized to package the concatameric viral DNA into virions formed at cytoplasmic virus assembly sites. Iridoviral DNA, unlike other DNA viruses infecting eukaryotic cells, is circularly permuted and exhibits terminal redundancies.

== Transmission and epizoology ==
Transmission of megalocytivirus is believed to occur when a naïve fish ingests tissues from infected fish or via contaminated water. Considerable effort has been expended to understand the transmission and epizoology of megalocytiviruses because of the economic importance of commercial fisheries and aquaculture operations. Iridoviral epizootics do not correlate well with commercial food fish trade routes, with the notable exception of larval fish trade in Korea and Japan.

A second potential mechanism for accidental movement of infected fish is the international trade in ornamental or aquarium fishes, which includes the global trade of approximately 5000 freshwater and 1450 saltwater fishes. Each year over 1 billion individual fish are shipped among more than 100 nations, creating a serious concern for the spread of megalocytiviruses as well as other important fish pathogens. There is already substantial evidence of this problem: megalocytiviruses which are genetically identical or extremely similar to ISKNV have been isolated from ornamental fishes (gouramis) that were being traded internationally. Furthermore, an Australian outbreak of megalocytivirus among farmed Murray cod (Maccullochella peelii) was linked to imported gouramis in pet shops. In addition, a 2008 study reported 10 aquarium fish species that tested positive for ISKNV in Korea.

== Pathogenesis ==
As megalocytiviruses have only been recently identified and described, the pathogenesis of megalocytivirus infection is relatively poorly understood. Clinical signs associated with infection are nonspecific and may include appetite loss, uncoordinated swimming, lethargy, coelomic distention, darkening skin color, petechiae, fin erosion, and death.

Large conspicuous hypertrophied cells, for which the genus is named, are evident in multiple organs when diseased tissues are examined by histopathology; these distinctive cells are commonly observed in the kidney, spleen and gastrointestinal tract and less commonly seen in the liver, gills, heart, and connective tissue. The hypertrophied cells are frequently perivascular in distribution and are greatly enlarged due to large granular to foamy basophilic cytoplasmic inclusion bodies. If the distended cells occlude the vasculature, focal areas of ischemic necrosis may be evident within various organs. It has been suggested by some researchers that the hypertrophied cells are some type of leukocyte, which is consistent with their tissue distribution.
