= Lymphocystivirus =

Virus classification
- (unranked): Virus
- Realm: Varidnaviria
- Kingdom: Bamfordvirae
- Phylum: Nucleocytoviricota
- Class: Megaviricetes
- Order: Pimascovirales
- Family: Iridoviridae
- Subfamily: Alphairidovirinae
- Genus: Lymphocystivirus

Genus of viruses

Lymphocystivirus is a genus of viruses, in the family Iridoviridae. Fish serve as natural hosts. There are four species in this genus. Diseases associated with this genus include: tumor-like growths on the skin.

== Hosts ==
Lymphocystivirus is one of seven genera of viruses within the viral family Iridoviridae, and one of three genera within this family which infect teleost fishes, along with Megalocytivirus and Ranavirus. Lymphocystiviruses infect more than 140 freshwater and marine species, spanning at least 42 host families worldwide, causing the chronic, self-limiting clinical disease, lymphocystis. While lymphocystis does not cause mass mortality events like megalocytiviruses and ranaviruses, fish with lymphocystis exhibit grossly visible papilloma-like skin lesions which substantially reduce their commercial value. No vaccines are currently available for lymphocystis viruses.

== Taxonomy ==
The genus contains the following species, listed by scientific name and followed by the exemplar virus of the species:

- Lymphocystivirus micropogonias1, Lymphocystis disease virus-White croaker (LCDV-WC)
- Lymphocystivirus paralichthys1, Lymphocystis disease virus-China (LCDV-C)
- Lymphocystivirus platichthys1, Lymphocystis disease virus 1 (LCDV-1)
- Lymphocystivirus sparus1, Lymphocystis disease virus-Sparus aurata (LCDV-Sa)

== LCDV genome ==
Lymphocystiviruses are Group I viruses with a dsDNA genome. The LCDV-1 genome is approximately 102.7 kilobase pairs (kbp) in length, with 195 potential open reading frames (ORF), and codes for two DNA-dependent RNA polymerase subunits, a DNA methyltransferase, a DNA polymerase, a guanosine triphosphate phosphohydrolase (GTPase), a helicase, protein kinases, a ribonucleoside diphosphate reductase, and zinc-finger proteins, among others. The LCDV-2 genome is similar to that of LCDV-1 but is slightly smaller, approximately 98 kilobase pairs (kbp) in length.

== Structure ==
Viruses in the genus Lymphocystivirus are enveloped, with icosahedral and polyhedral geometries, and T=189-217 symmetry. The diameter is around 120-350 nm. Genomes are linear, around 100kb in length.

Genus	Structure	Symmetry	Capsid	Genomic arrangement	Genomic segmentation
Lymphocystivirus	Polyhedral	T=189-217		Linear	Monopartite

== Life cycle ==
Lymphocystiviruses attach to the host cell and enter by receptor-mediated endocytosis similar to other iridoviruses. Viral particles are uncoated and move to the nucleus of the cell, where DNA replication begins via a virally encoded DNA polymerase. Viral DNA then moves to the cytoplasm for the second stage of DNA replication, which results in the formation of DNA concatemers. The concatameric viral DNA is subsequently packaged via a headful mechanism into virions. The lymphocystis viral genome is circularly permuted with terminally redundant DNA. DNA-templated transcription is the method of transcription. Fish serve as the natural host.

Genus	Host details	Tissue tropism	Entry details	Release details	Replication site	Assembly site	Transmission
Lymphocystivirus	Fish	None	Cell receptor endocytosis	Lysis; budding	Nucleus	Cytoplasm	Unknown

== Pathogenesis ==
Lymphocystis disease is a chronic disease that rarely causes mortality. Infection causes transformation and hypertrophy (approximately 1000x) of cells in the dermis, forming grossly visible lymphocystis nodules, as well as transformation and hypertrophy in cells of the connective tissues of various internal organs. Fibroblasts and osteoblasts are specifically targeted by the virus. Lymphocystis viruses are not easily grown in cell culture, placing limitations on in vitro molecular pathogenesis experiments.

== Diagnostic pathology ==
As lymphocystis viruses are not easily grown in cell culture, diagnosis is based on clinical signs, gross pathology, histopathology, serology, and/or polymerase chain reaction (PCR)-based molecular assays.

=== Gross pathology ===
The pathology of lymphocystis consists of papilloma-like skin lesions composed of greatly hypertrophied infected host cells embedded in extracellular matrix, sometimes called lymphocystis tumor cells, which are grossly evident as white spots on the skin and fins of infected fish. These lesions proliferate as epithelial tumors in some cases.

=== Histopathology ===
In a recent comparison of lymphocystis histopathology of four unrelated marine species, lesions consistently associated with lymphocystis included hypertrophied cells displaying irregular nuclei, basophilic cytoplasmic inclusion bodies that stained positively via Feulgen and Mann's reaction and Periodic acid-Shiff (PAS)-positive hyaline capsules. Hyaline capsules arise from the extracellular matrix that is produced by the infected cells, and are composed of sulphated and carboxylated glycoproteins (acid mucopolysaccharides). In contrast, the inclusion body shape, distribution of viral particles within the cytoplasm and overall appearance of lymphocystis nodules varied by species. The species examined in this study included the white-spotted puffer (Arothron hispidus), the Japanese sea bass (Lateolabrax japonicus), olive flounder (Paralichthys olivaceus) and the "sting fish" or Schlegel's black rockfish (Sebastes schegeli)

=== Serology ===
Several serologic assays have been developed to identify LCDV infections, including flow cytometry, immunoblot, and immunofluorescence. However, PCR-based molecular assays are more practical for most applications.

=== Electron microscopy ===
Transmission electron microscopy (TEM) of infected cells reveals cytoplasmic virus particles typically measuring from 198-227 nm in diameter (in some cases as large as 380 nm) and electron-dense substances in the perinuclear space.

=== Molecular pathology ===
Published PCR primers and protocol are available to amplify a portion of the LCDV-1 MCP. When the PCR diagnostic assay is combined with slot blot, diagnostic sensitivity is increased, facilitating the diagnosis of asymptomatic LCDV-1 infections.
