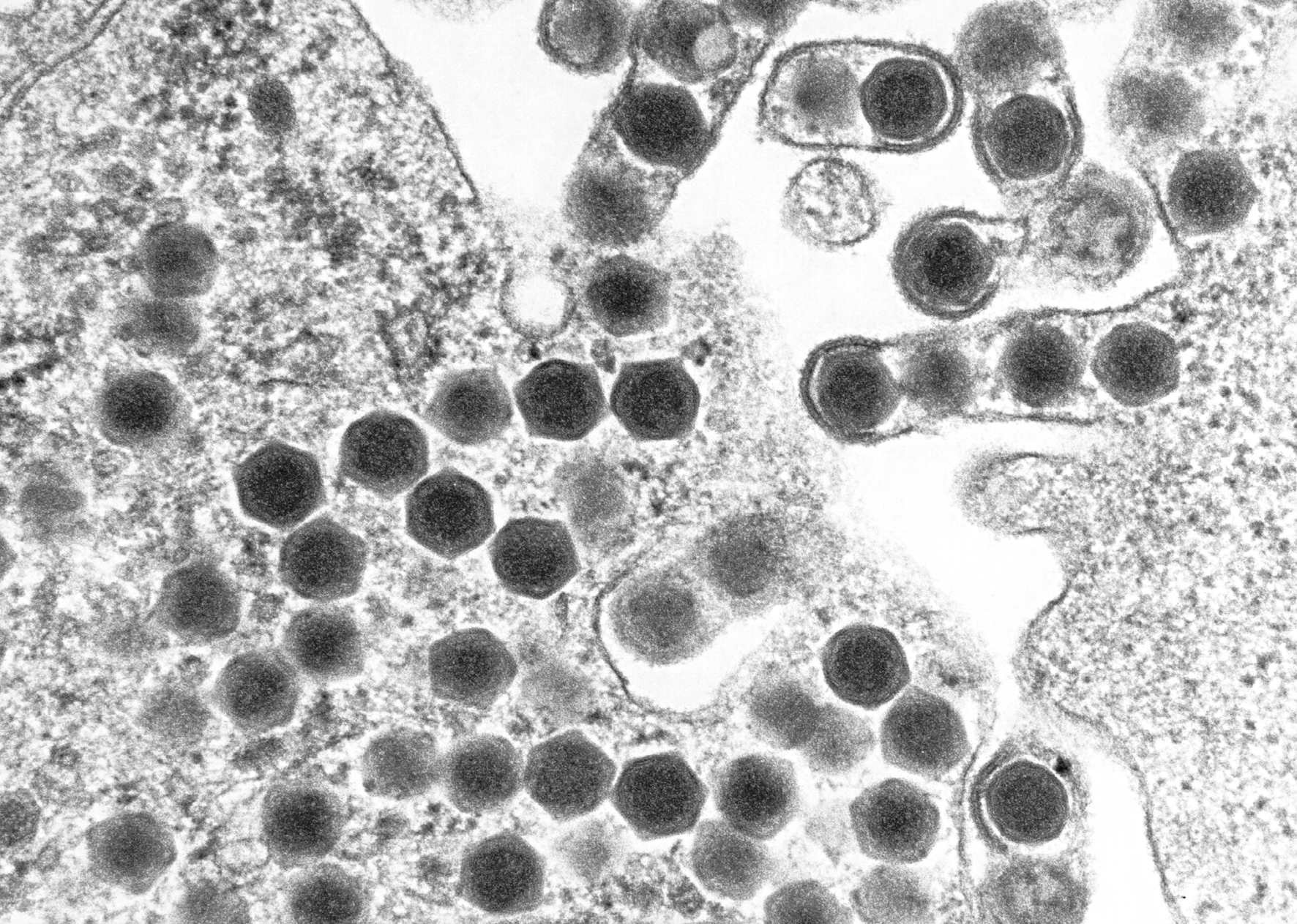
- Transmission electron micrograph of ranaviruses (dark hexagons) gathering at the cell border and leaving the cell via a process called "budding"

Virus classification
- (unranked): Virus
- Realm: Varidnaviria
- Kingdom: Bamfordvirae
- Phylum: Nucleocytoviricota
- Class: Megaviricetes
- Order: Pimascovirales
- Family: Iridoviridae
- Subfamily: Alphairidovirinae
- Genus: Ranavirus

= Ranavirus =

Genus of viruses infecting amphibians and reptiles

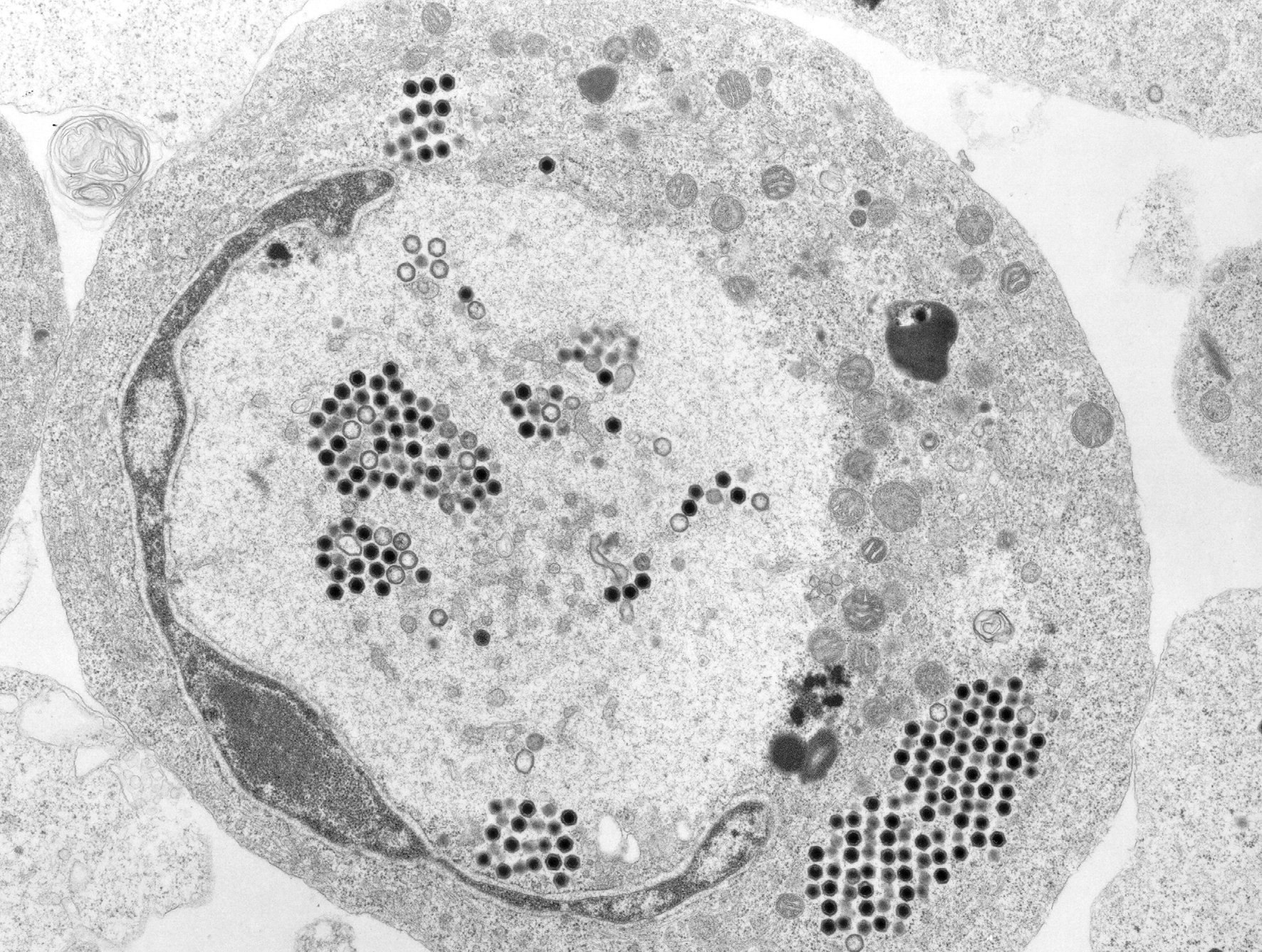
Transmission electron micrograph of a cell infected with ranaviruses, which gather in the cytoplasm and in the assembly bodies next to the contorted nucleus

Ranavirus is a genus of viruses in the family Iridoviridae. There are six other genera of viruses within the family Iridoviridae, but Ranavirus is the only one that includes viruses that are infectious to amphibians and reptiles. Additionally, it is one of the three genera within this family which infect teleost fishes, along with Lymphocystivirus and Megalocytivirus.

== Ecological impact ==
The Ranaviruses, like the Megalocytiviruses, are an emerging group of closely related double-stranded DNA (dsDNA) viruses which cause systemic infections in a wide variety of wild and cultured fresh and saltwater fishes. As with Megalocytiviruses, Ranavirus outbreaks are therefore of considerable economic importance in aquaculture, as epizootics can result in moderate fish loss or mass mortality events of cultured fishes. Unlike Megalocytiviruses, however, Ranavirus infections in amphibians have been implicated as a contributing factor in the global decline of amphibian populations. The impact of Ranaviruses on amphibian populations has been compared to the chytrid fungus Batrachochytrium dendrobatidis, the causative agent of chytridiomycosis. In the UK, the severity of disease outbreaks is thought to have increased due to climate change. Recent studies indicate that Ranavirus outbreaks occur globally but are reported unevenly, with (33 out of 68) documented cases being in North America, while only one case was noted in Oceania and two in Africa. This pattern suggests significant geographic gaps in disease surveillance and reporting in various regions.

== Etymology ==
Rana is derived from the Latin for "frog", reflecting the first isolation of a Ranavirus in 1960s from the Northern leopard frog (Lithobates pipiens).

== Evolution ==
VOA report about Ranavirus

The ranaviruses appear to have evolved from a fish virus which subsequently infected amphibians and reptiles.

== Hosts ==
=== Anuran hosts ===
- Wood frogs (Lithobates sylvaticus)
- American Bullfrog (Lithobates catesbieanus)
- Pickerel Frog
- Craugastor ranoides (Craugastor ranoides) – Critically Endangered
- Craugastor taurus (Craugastor taurus) – Endangered
- Agalychnis lemur (Agalychnis lemur) – Critically Endangered
- Litoria lorica (Litoria lorica) – Critically Endangered
- Rana muscosa (Rana muscosa) – Endangered
- Rana sierrae (Rana sierrae) – Vulnerable

=== Urodelan hosts ===
- Alpine newt (Mesotriton alpestris)

=== Reptilian hosts ===
- Green pythons (Chondropython viridis)
- Burmese star tortoises (Geochelone platynota)
- Leopard tortoise (Geochelone pardalis)
- Gopher tortoises (Gopherus polyphemus)
- Mountain lizard (Lacerta monticola)
- Eastern box turtles (Terrapene carolina carolina)
- Florida box turtles (Terrapene carolina bauri)
- Western ornate box turtles (Terrapene ornata)
- Spur-thighed tortoises (Testudo graeca)
- Hermann's tortoises (Testudo hermanni)
- Egyptian tortoises (Testudo kleinmanni)
- Russian tortoises (Testudo horsfieldii)
- Marginated tortoises (Testudo marginata)
- Red-eared sliders (Trachemys scripta elegans)
- Common snapping turtles (Chelydra serpentina)
- Chinese softshell turtles (Pelodiscus sinensis)
- Common flat-tail gecko (Uroplatus fimbriatus)
- Eastern Fence Lizard (Sceloporus undulatus)

== Taxonomy ==
The genus contains the following species, listed by scientific name and followed by the exemplar virus of the species:

- Ranavirus alytes1, Common midwife toad virus-E
- Ranavirus ambystoma1, Ambystoma tigrinum virus
- Ranavirus epinephelus1, Singapore grouper iridovirus
- Ranavirus gadus1, Cod iridovirus
- Ranavirus micropterus1, Largemouth bass virus
- Ranavirus perca1, Epizootic haematopoietic necrosis virus
- Ranavirus rana1, Frog virus 3

The family Iridoviridae is divided into seven genera which include Chloriridovirus, Iridovirus, Lymphocystivirus, Megalocytivirus, and Ranavirus. The genus Ranavirus contains three viruses known to infect amphibians (Ambystoma tigrinum virus (ATV), Bohle iridovirus (BIV), and frog virus 3).

== Structure ==
Ranaviruses are large icosahedral DNA viruses measuring approximately 150 nm in diameter with a large single linear dsDNA genome of roughly 105 kbp which codes for around 100 gene products. The main structural component of the protein capsid is the major capsid protein (MCP).

Genus	Structure	Symmetry	Capsid	Genomic arrangement	Genomic segmentation
Ranavirus	Polyhedral	T=133 or 147		Linear	Monopartite

== Replication ==
Ranaviral replication is well studied using Frog virus 3 (FV3). Replication of FV3 occurs between 12 and 32 degrees Celsius. Ranaviruses enter the host cell by receptor-mediated endocytosis. Viral particles are uncoated and subsequently move into the cell nucleus, where viral DNA replication begins via a virally encoded DNA polymerase. Viral DNA then abandons the cell nucleus and begins the second stage of DNA replication in the cytoplasm, ultimately forming DNA concatemers. The viral DNA is then packaged via a headful mechanism into infectious virions. The ranavirus genome, like other iridoviral genomes is circularly permuted and exhibits terminally redundant DNA. There is evidence that ranavirus infections target macrophages as a mechanism for gaining entry to cells.

Genus	Host details	Tissue tropism	Entry details	Release details	Replication site	Assembly site	Transmission
Ranavirus	Frogs; snakes	None	Cell receptor endocytosis	Lysis; budding	Nucleus	Cytoplasm	Contact

=== DNA repair ===
Andrias davidianus ranavirus, isolated from the Chinese giant salamander, encodes a protein (Rad2 homolog) that has a key role in the repair of DNA by homologous recombination and in DNA double-strand break repair.

== Transmission ==
Transmission of ranaviruses is thought to occur by multiple routes, including contaminated soil, direct contact, waterborne exposure, and ingestion of infected tissues during predation, necrophagy, or cannibalism. Ranaviruses are relatively stable in aquatic environments, persisting several weeks or longer outside a host organism.

== Epizoology ==
Amphibian mass mortality events due to Ranavirus have been reported in Asia, Europe, North America, and South America. Ranaviruses have been isolated from wild populations of amphibians in Australia, but have not been associated with mass mortality on that continent.

== Pathogenesis ==
Synthesis of viral proteins begins within hours of viral entry with necrosis or apoptosis occurring as early as a few hours post infection.

== Seasonal disease dynamics ==
There are several hypotheses for seasonal outbreak patterns observed for Ranavirosis mortality events. Ranaviruses grow in vitro between 8–30 °C, however for most isolates, warmer temperature result in faster viral replication. A combination of this optimal growth temperature along with shifts in larval amphibian susceptibility result in seasonal outbreak events most often observed during warm summer months. Amphibian mortality events are often observed as larval amphibians reach late Gosner stages approaching metamorphosis. As larval amphibians reach metamorphic stages of development, their immune system is reorganized prior to the development of adult tissues. During this time period, amphibians are stressed, and their immune systems are down regulated. This decrease in immune function and warmer environmental temperatures allows for greater viral replication and cellular damage to occur. Across 64 mortality events in the United States 54% were found to occur between June-August.

== Environmental persistence ==
The environmental persistence of Ranaviruses is not well understood. In realistic environmental conditions, the T90 value of an FV3-like virus is 1 day. The duration of persistence is likely affected by temperature and microbial conditions. It is unlikely that ranaviruses persist in the environment outside of host species between outbreak events. Researchers have explored several pathogen reservoirs for the virus, which may explain how it can persist within an amphibian community. In some amphibian populations, sub-clinically infected individuals may serve as reservoirs for the pathogen. These sub-clinically infected individuals are responsible for reintroduction of the virus to the larval population. With ranaviruses being capable of infecting multiple taxa, and with there being differences in susceptibility between taxa, it is likely that sympatric fish and reptile species may serve as reservoirs for the virus as well. Interclass transmission has been proven through the use of mesocosm studies.

== Gross pathology ==
Gross lesions associated with Ranavirus infection include erythema, generalized swelling, hemorrhage, limb swelling, and swollen and friable livers.

== See also ==
- Decline in amphibian populations
