= Invertebrate iridescent virus 6 =

Virus classification
- (unranked): Virus
- Realm: Varidnaviria
- Kingdom: Bamfordvirae
- Phylum: Nucleocytoviricota
- Class: Megaviricetes
- Order: Pimascovirales
- Family: Iridoviridae
- Genus: Iridovirus
- Species: Iridovirus chilo1

Species of invertebrate iridescent virus

Invertebrate iridescent virus 6 (Chilo iridescent virus, CIV, IIV6, Iridovirus chilo1) is the type species in the genus Iridovirus, and is an invertebrate iridescent virus, which was first isolated from a diseased larvae of Chilo suppressalis in Japan. There are at least two identified strains of IIV6.

IIV6 infects invertebrates, especially insects that live in damp or aquatic habitats. Compared to others, IIV6 has a low mortality rate in hosts.

== Host range ==
The host range of IIV6 was investigated through the use of intrahemocoelic inoculation, and it was discovered to be of at least 100 insect species across six orders:

- Lepidoptera (Ostrinia nubilalis)
- Coleoptera (Diaprepes abbreviatus)
- Diptera (especially Culicidae)
- Hymenoptera
- Hemiptera (Bemisia tabaci)
- Orthoptera

IIV6 was experimentally found to be capable of infecting reptile cells.
