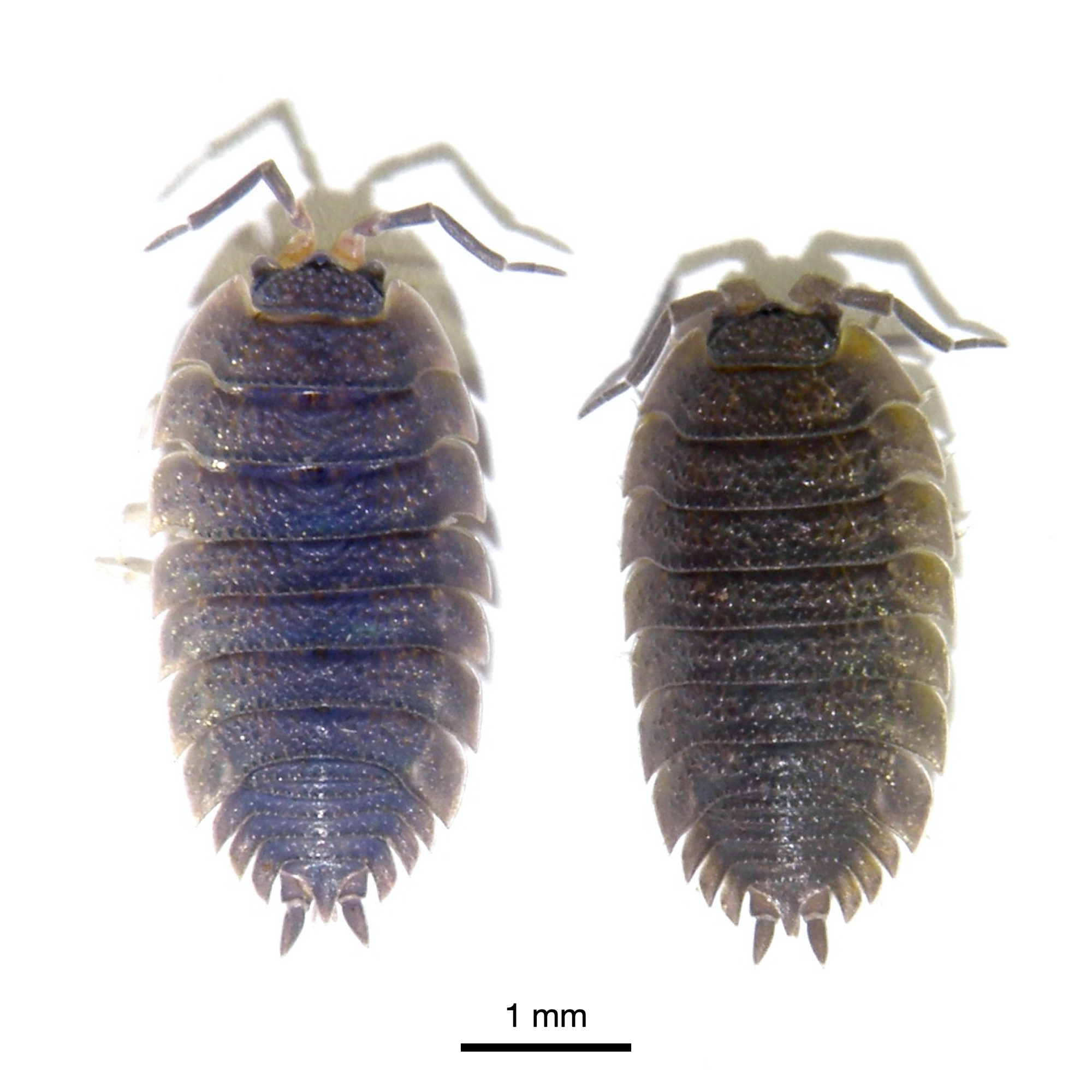
- Porcellio scaber symptomatic of Invertebrate iridescent virus 31 (L) and individual with typical colouration (R)
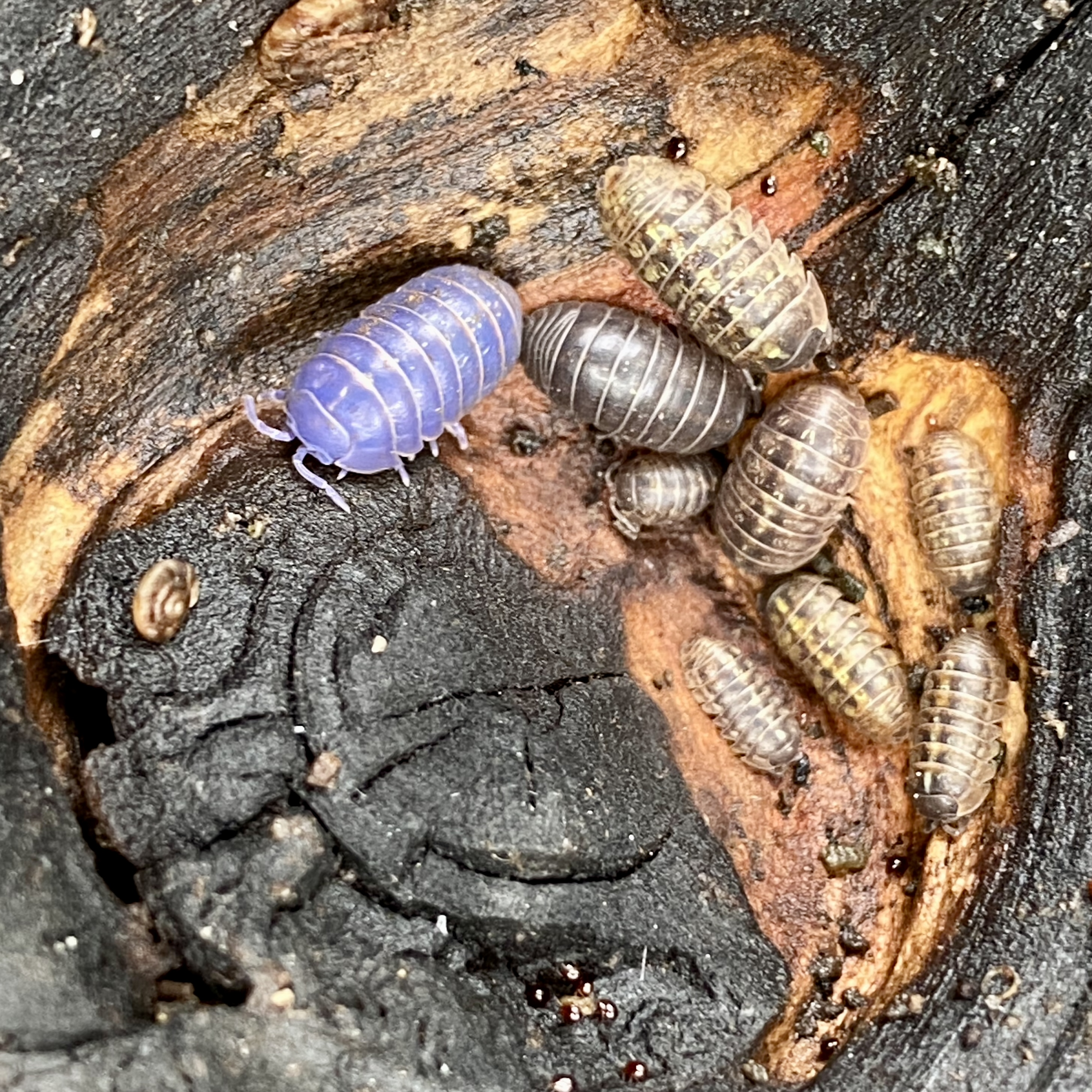
- Armadillidium vulgare symptomatic of Invertebrate iridescent virus 31 (left) among individuals with typical colouration (right)

Virus classification
- (unranked): Virus
- Realm: Varidnaviria
- Kingdom: Bamfordvirae
- Phylum: Nucleocytoviricota
- Class: Megaviricetes
- Order: Pimascovirales
- Family: Iridoviridae
- Genus: Iridovirus
- Species: Iridovirus armadillidium1

Synonyms
- Isopod iridovirus

= Invertebrate iridescent virus 31 =

Species of virus

Genomic information
- NCBI ID: GCA_000923155.1
- Genome size: 220,222 nucleotides
- Year of completion: 2014

Invertebrate iridescent virus 31 (IIV-31, Iridovirus armadillidium1) , also called isopod iridovirus, is a species of invertebrate iridescent virus in the genus Iridovirus. Oniscidea (commonly known by a variety of names including woodlouse, pillbug, slater, roly-poly, potato bug, et al.) serve as hosts. Infection is associated with decreased responsiveness in the host, increased mortality and the emergence of an iridescent blue or bluish-purple colour due to the reflection of light off a paracrystalline arrangement of virions within the tissues.

== Taxonomy ==
In earlier centuries, blue individuals of otherwise drab oniscidean species had been discovered. They were sometimes interpreted to be new subspecies and were described as such: Ligidium hypnorum coeruleum Lereboullet 1843 and L. hypnorum amethystinum Schöbl 1861 (in reference to cerulean and amethyst, respectively). In 1980, the first research was published showing that the phenomenon of blue oniscideans is in fact a disease caused by an iridovirus. The aforementioned 'subspecies' have since been reinterpreted, not as distinct taxonomic entities, but as historical findings of individuals infected with this isopod iridovirus.

In 2014, the 220-kilobase genome sequence of this virus was published. Then in 2018 (as part of the 2018b taxonomy release), it was formally accepted as a species by the International Committee on Taxonomy of Viruses, named Invertebrate iridescent virus 31 and placed in the genus Iridovirus alongside the mosquito-hosted species Invertebrate iridescent virus 6.

== Host range ==
IIV-31 infects members of the suborder Oniscidea. In particular, it has been reported in the scientific literature from the following families and species:

- Armadillidiidae (Armadillidium vulgare, A. decorum)
- Cylisticidae (Cylisticus convexus)
- Ligiidae (Ligidium hypnorum, L. koreanum)
- Oniscidae (Oniscus asellus)
- Philosciidae (Burmoniscus kathmandia, Philoscia affinis, P. muscorum)
- Platyarthridae (Niambia capensis)
- Porcellionidae (Porcellio dilatatus, P. laevis, P. siculoccidentalis, P. spinicornis, P. scaber, Porcellionides pruinosus)
- Trachelipodidae (Trachelipus rathkii)
- Trichoniscidae (Androniscus dentiger, Haplophthalmus danicus, H. mengii, Hyloniscus riparius, Trichoniscoides albidus, T. helveticus, Trichoniscus panormidensis, T. pusillus)

== Geographic range ==
This virus has a wide geographic distribution. In particular, it has been reported in the scientific literature from:

- Asia (Japan, Turkey)
- Europe (former Czechoslovakia, France, Italy, the Netherlands, Russia, United Kingdom)
- North America (United States)
- Oceania (Australia)

== Tentative fossil ==
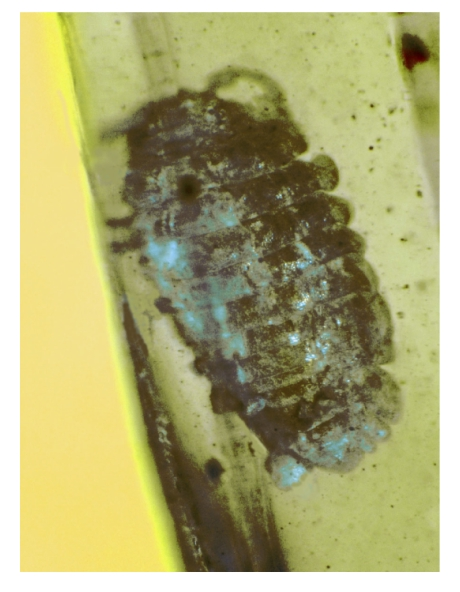
Early Cretaceous Burmese amber containing an isopod with iridescent blue areas

An oniscidean fossilised in Early Cretaceous Burmese amber was found that features iridescent blue patches. George Poinar Jr., an entomologist and palaeontologist studying this fossil, tentatively suggested that the colouration may represent an ancient case of IIV-31.
