= Pristimantis lindae =

Conservation status
- Least Concern (IUCN 3.1)

Scientific classification
- Kingdom: Animalia
- Phylum: Chordata
- Class: Amphibia
- Order: Anura
- Family: Strabomantidae
- Genus: Pristimantis
- Subgenus: Pristimantis
- Species: P. lindae

Binomial name
- Pristimantis lindae (Duellman, 1978)

Synonyms
- Eleutherodactylus lindae Duellman, 1978

Species of frog

Pristimantis lindae is a species of frog in the family Strabomantidae. It is endemic to Peru and only known from Kosñipata Valley (also spelled Cosñipata) on the northeastern slopes of the Cadena de Paucartambo, a frontal range of the Cordillera Oriental in Cusco Region. The specific name lindae honors Linda Trueb, an American herpetologist and wife of William E. Duellman, the species describer. Nevertheless, common name Santa Isabel robber frog has been coined for this species.

== Description ==
The holotype is an adult female measuring 39 mm (1.5 in) in snout–vent length. The body is robust. The head is wider than it is long; the snout is long and rounded. The tympanum is prominent. The forearms are slender whereas the hind limbs are moderately short and robust. The fingers and the toes have lateral fringes and bear expanded discs; the fingers also have basal webbing. The dorsum is shagreened and tan in color, with dark brown markings. The throat is pinkish cream and has black flecks. The flanks and the belly are cream with black reticulations. The iris is bronze and has a median horizontal reddish brown streak.

== Habitat and conservation ==
Pristimantis lindae occurs in montane tropical cloud forest at elevations of 1,300–2,100 m (4,300–6,900 ft) above sea level. Specimens have often been found perched about 2–3 m (7–10 ft) above the ground, although the holotype was on a bush. Development is presumably direct (i.e., there is no free-living larval stage).

It is an uncommon species but the population appears to be stable. Specimens infected with Ranavirus and Batrachochytrium dendrobatidis have been found, but craugastorid frogs do not seem to be adversely affected by such infections. Pristimantis lindae occurs in the buffer zone of the Manu National Park.
