= IIV =

IIV may stand for:

- Inactivated influenza vaccine, an anti-influenza vaccine in inactivated form
- Invertebrate iridescent virus, vernacular for viruses in the subfamily Betairidovirinae
- Ministry of Internal Affairs (Uzbekistan) (Uzbek: Ichki Ishlar Vazirligi)
