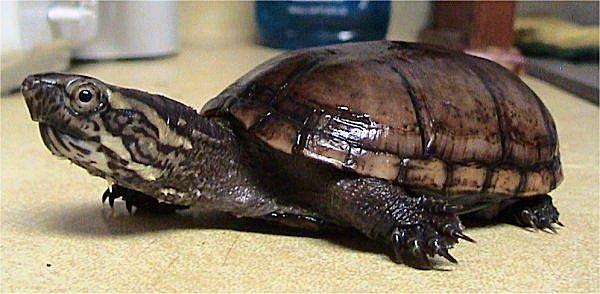

Conservation status
- Least Concern (IUCN 3.1)

Scientific classification
- Kingdom: Animalia
- Phylum: Chordata
- Class: Reptilia
- Order: Testudines
- Suborder: Cryptodira
- Family: Kinosternidae
- Genus: Kinosternon
- Species: K. subrubrum

Binomial name
- Kinosternon subrubrum Bonnaterre, 1789

Synonyms
- Kinosternon subrubrum subrubrum List: Testudo subrubra Lacépède, 1788 (nomen suppressum); Testudo subrubra Bonnaterre, 1789; Testudo pensilvanica Gmelin, 1789; Emydes pensilvancia Brongniart, 1805 (ex errore); Emys pensylvanica Schweigger, 1812; Terrapene boscii Merrem, 1820; Terrapene pensylvanica — Merrem, 1820; Cistuda pensylvanica — Say, 1825; Sternotherus pensylvanica — Gray, 1825; Kinosternon pennsylvanicum Bell, 1825 (ex errore); Sternothaerus boscii — Bell, 1825; Kinosternum pensylvanicum — Bonaparte, 1830; Cinosternon pensylvanicum — Wagler, 1830; Emys (Kinosternon) pennsylvanica — Gray, 1831; Clemmys (Cinosternon) pensylvanica — Fitzinger, 1835; Kinosternon pensylvanicum — De Kay, 1842; Kinosternon (Kinosternon) doubledayii Gray, 1844; Kinosternon (Kinosternon) oblongum Gray, 1844; Kinosternum doubledayii — LeConte, 1854; Kinosternum pennsylvanicum — LeConte, 1854; Kinosternon punctatum Gray, 1856; Cinosternon pennsylvanicum — Agassiz, 1857; Cinosternum doubledayii — Agassiz, 1857; Cinosternum oblongum Agassiz, 1857; Cinosternum pennsylvanicum — Agassiz, 1857; Cistudo pennsylvanica — Agassiz, 1857; Terrapene pennsylvanica — Agassiz, 1857; Thyrosternum pennsylvanicum — Agassiz, 1857; Cinosternum doubledayi Agassiz, 1857 (ex errore); Cinosternum punctatum — Agassiz, 1857; Cinosternon doubledayii — Strauch, 1865; Swanka fasciata Gray, 1869; Cinosternum pensylvanicum — Boulenger, 1889; Kinosternon pensilvanicum Lönnberg, 1894 (ex errore); Cinosternonus pensylvanicum — Herrera, 1899; Cinosternum pensilvanicum — Siebenrock, 1907; Cinosternum pensilvanium Siebenrock, 1909 (ex errore); Testudo pensilvanica — Siebenrock, 1909; Kinosternon subrubrum subrubrum — Stejneger & Barbour, 1917; Kinonsternon subrubrum — Liner, 1954; Kinosternum subrubrum — Schwartz, 1961; Kinosternon subrum Richard, 1999 (ex errore); Kinosternon subrubrum hippocrepis List: Kinosternon hippocrepis Gray, 1856; Cinosternum hippocrepis — Agassiz, 1857; Cinosternon hippocrepis — Strauch, 1865; Kinosternon louisianae Baur, 1893; Cinosternum louisianae — Ditmars, 1907; Kinosternon subrubrum hippocrepis — Stejneger & Barbour, 1917

= Eastern mud turtle =

Species of turtle

The eastern mud turtle (Kinosternon subrubrum) or common mud turtle is a common species of turtle in the family Kinosternidae. The species is endemic to the United States. There are two recognized subspecies.

== Description ==
The eastern mud turtle is a small and often hard to identify species. It measures 3–4 in (7.6–10.2 cm) in carapace length. The carapace is keelless, lacks any pattern, and varies in color from yellowish to black. The plastron is large and double hinged, and can be yellowish to brown, and may sometimes have a dark pattern. The chin and throat are a yellowish grey, streaked and mottled with brown, while the limbs and tail are grayish. The eye, or iris, of the eastern mud turtle is yellow with dark clouding, and its feet are webbed.

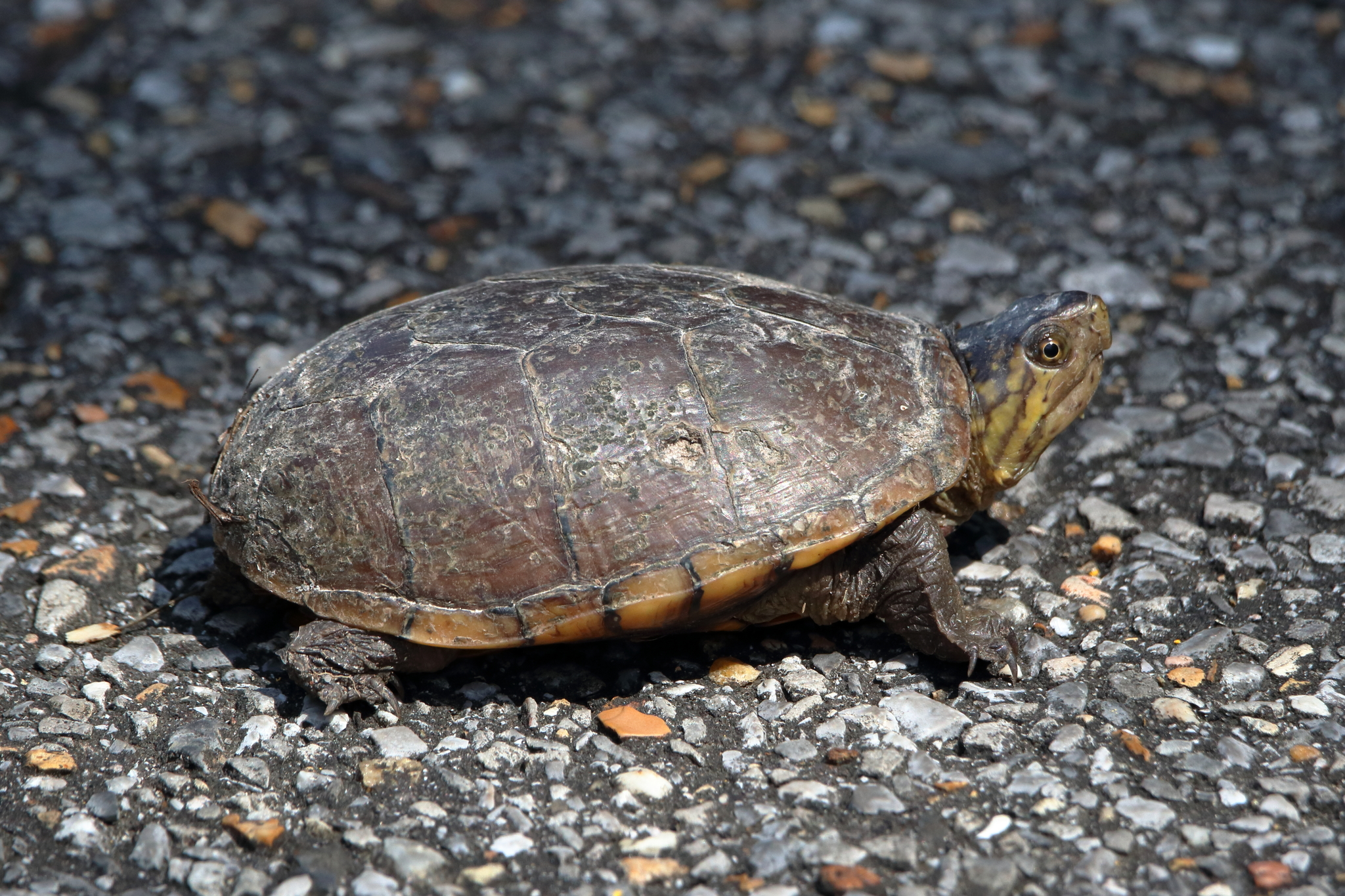
In Mississippi

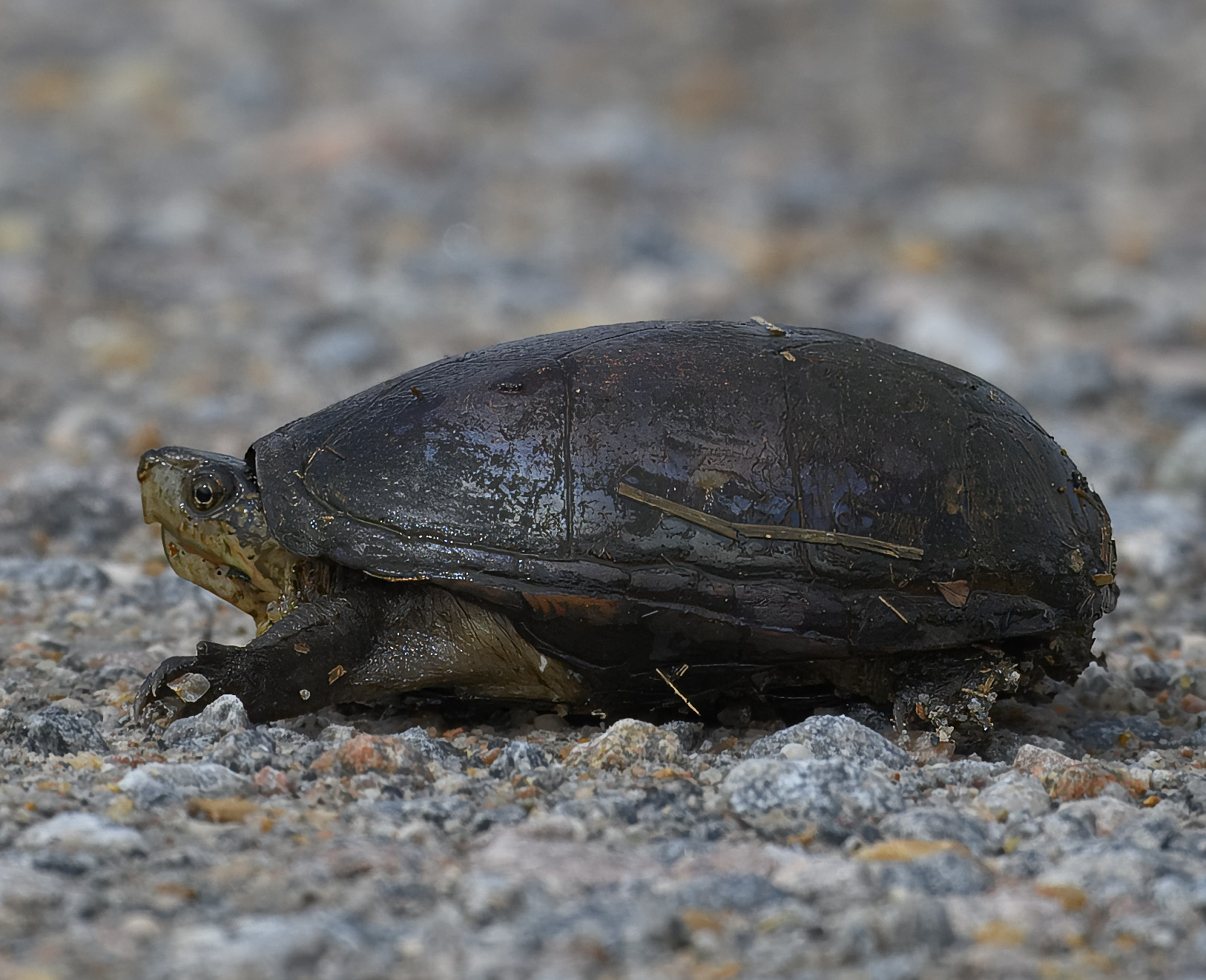

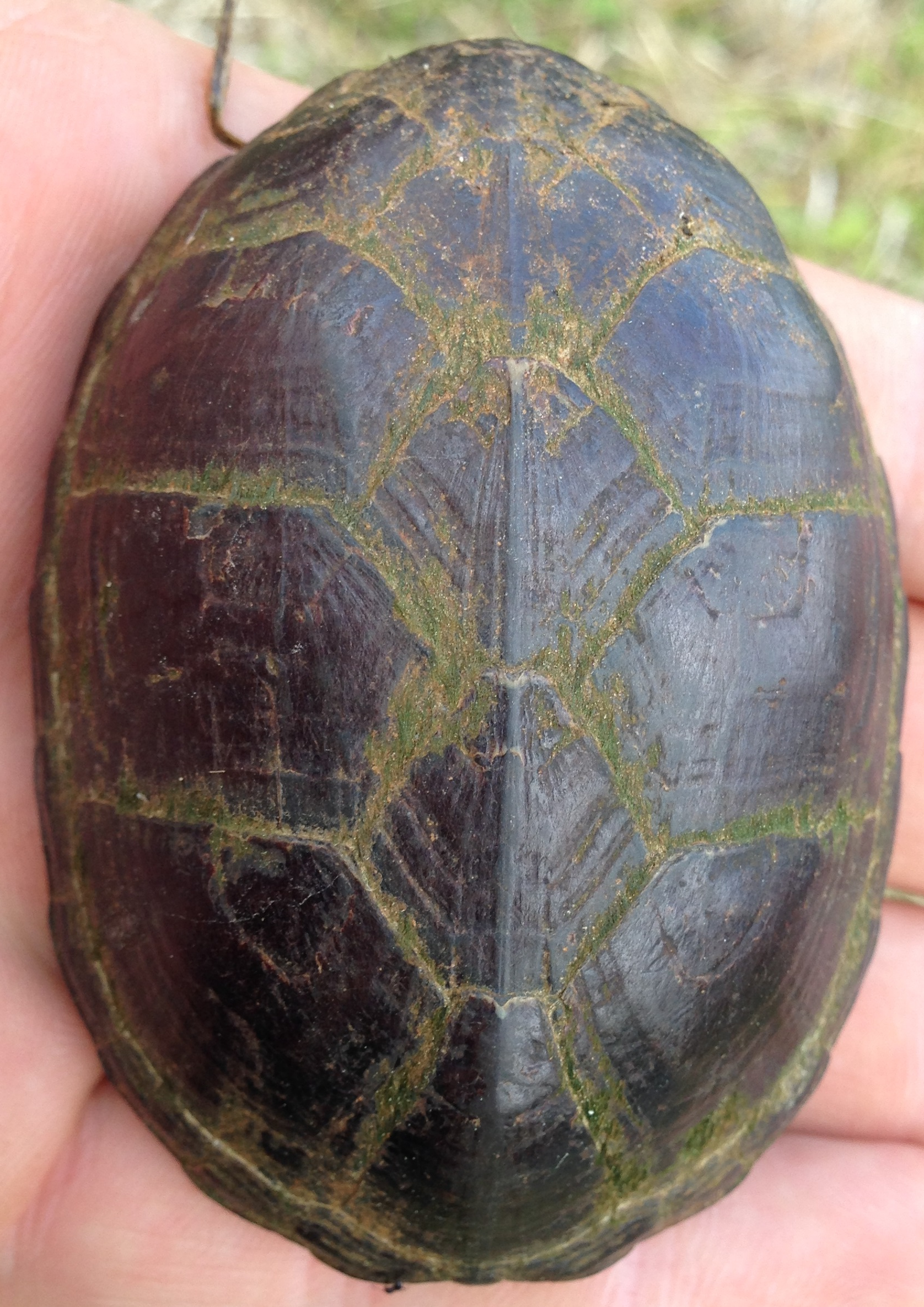
Carapace, Mississippi

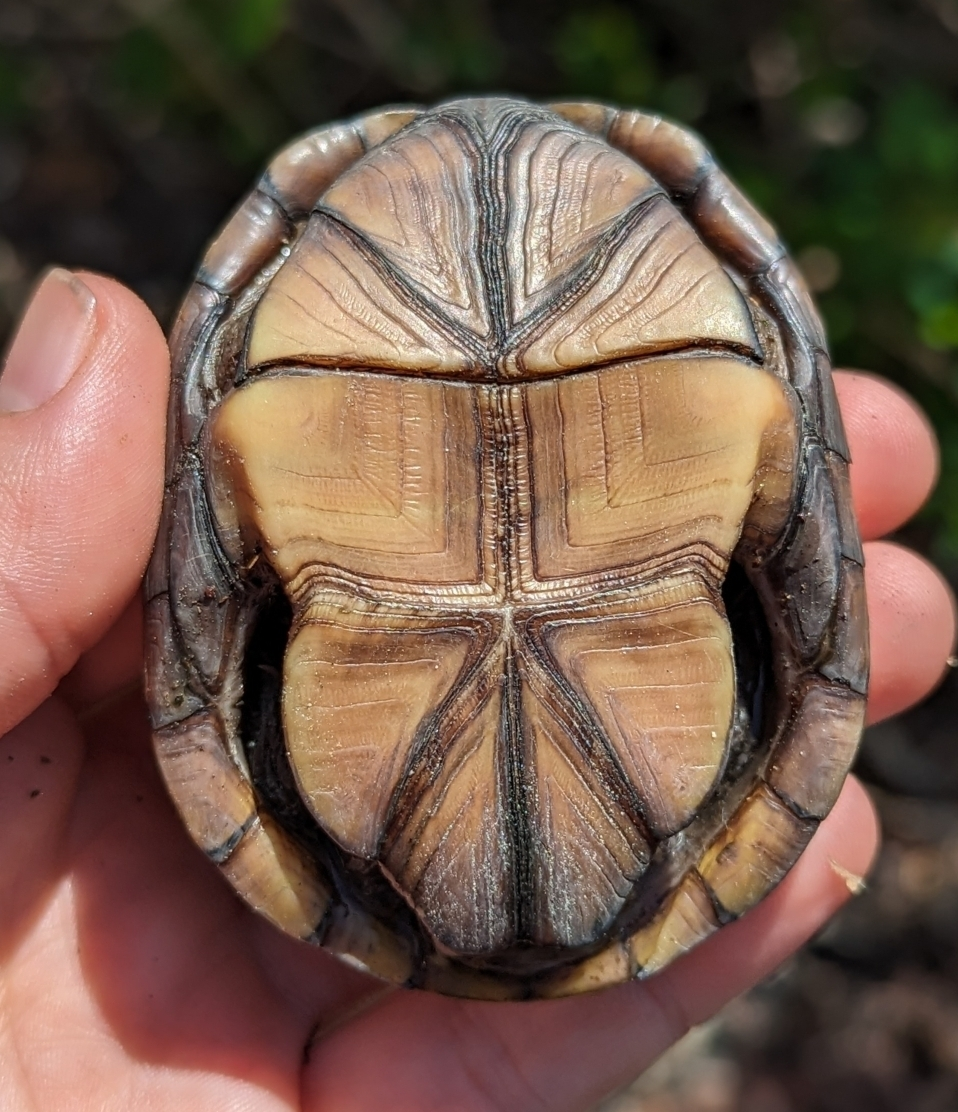
K. s. subrubrum plastron, in Maryland

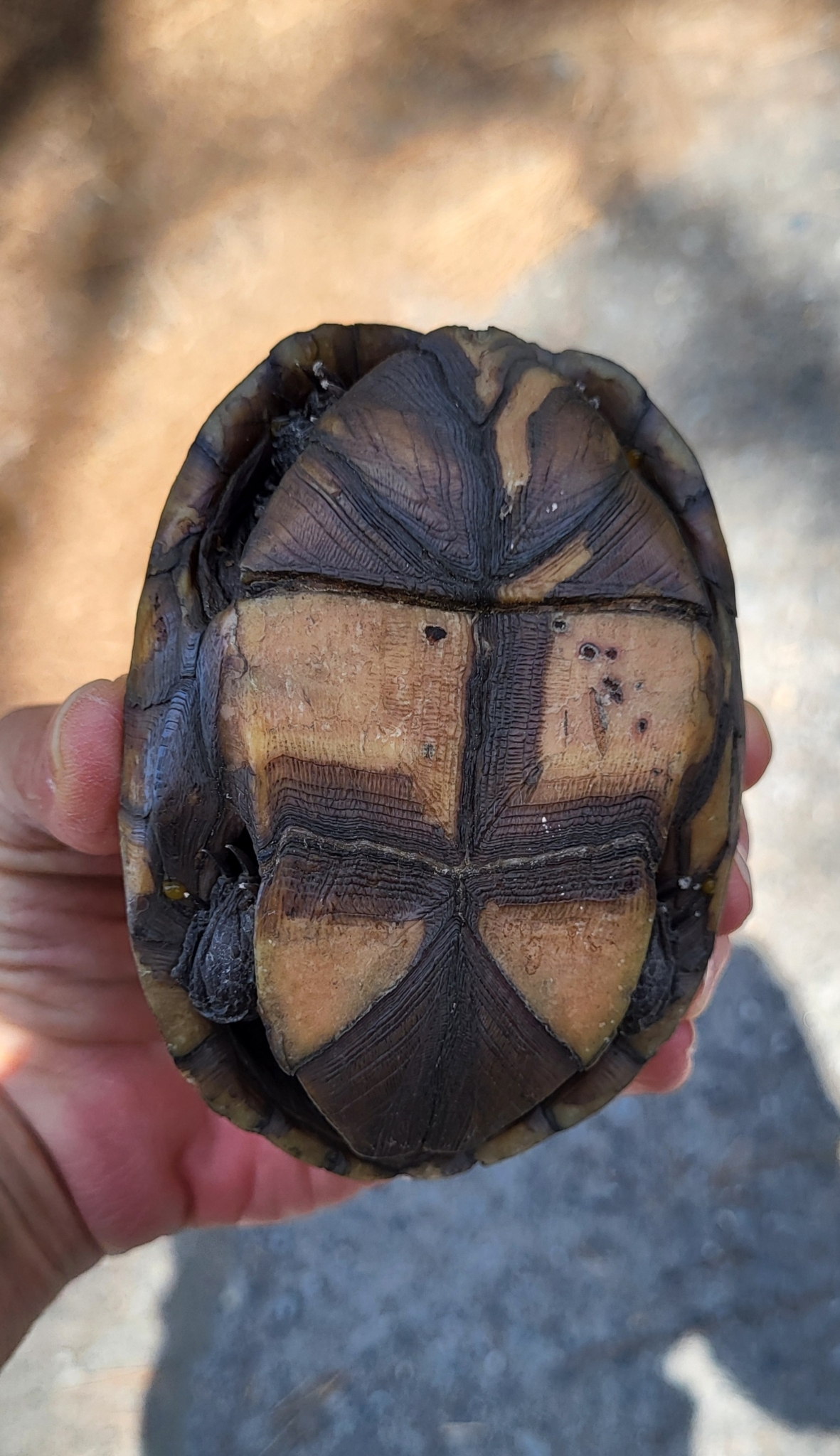
K. s. subrubrum plastron, in Delaware

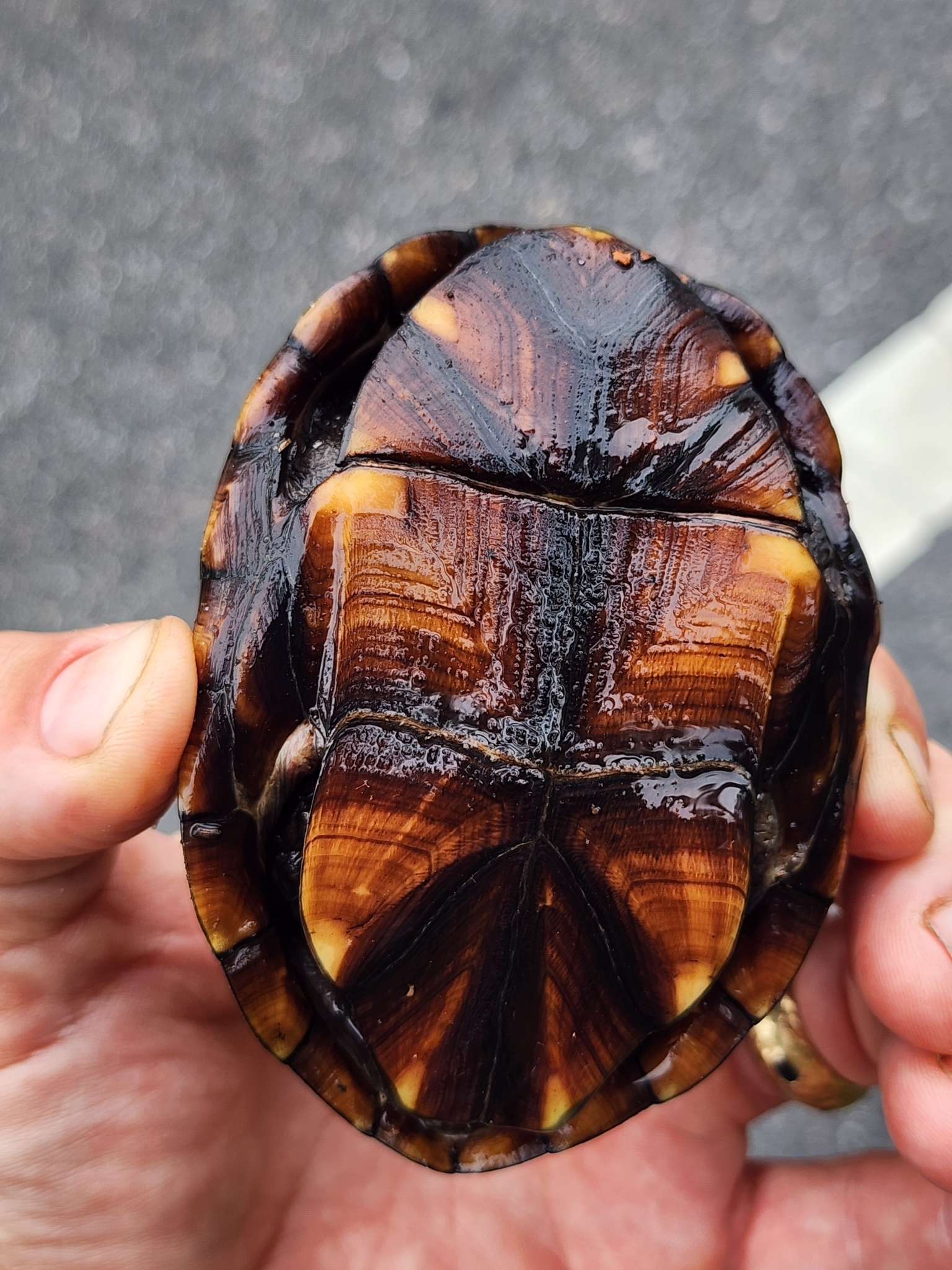
Plastron, in Florida

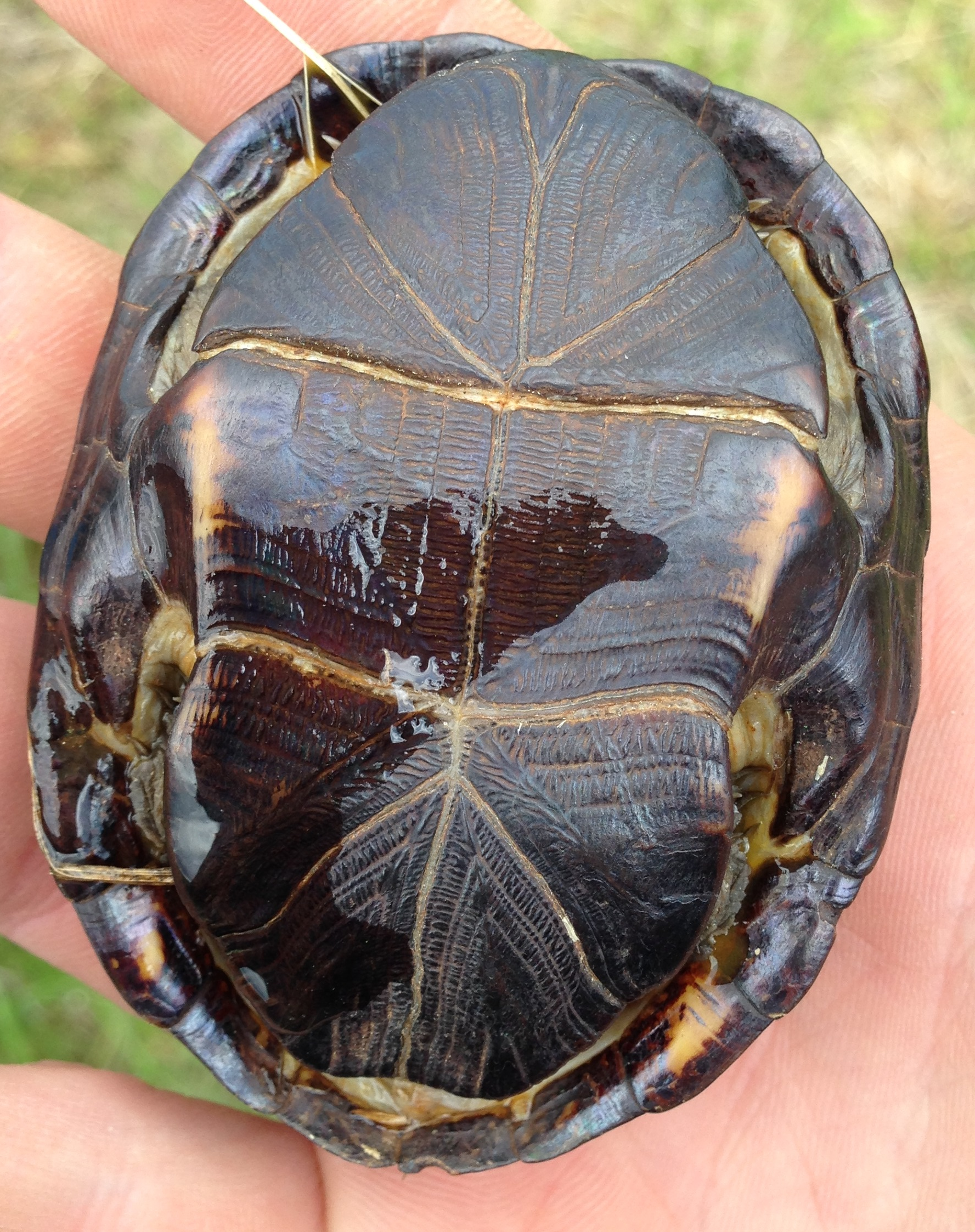
Plastron, in Mississippi

== Etymology ==
The specific name, subrubrum, meaning "under red", refers to the red-orange plastron of hatchlings.

== Diet ==
The eastern mud turtle is omnivorous and feeds on insects, crustaceans, mollusks, amphibians, carrion, and aquatic vegetation. Smaller eastern mud turtles prey on small aquatic insects, algae, and carrion, whereas larger ones can feed on any type of food that they can fit in their mouth.

== Movement ==
Eastern mud turtles have been documented to migrate seasonally from uplands that they frequent to wetlands and aquatic movement in their home ranges. Their home ranges can be as small as .05 ha to 69.5 ha, depending on how close together their essential resources are. In anthropogenically altered landscapes, such as golf courses, Eastern Mud Turtles were shown to cross an average of four different habitat types while emerging during the summer and fall.

== Habitat ==
Mud turtles (genus Kinosternon) are fresh water turtles that are found in the Southeastern and Northeastern United States. They live in rivers, lakes, ponds, ditches and swamps. Mud turtles prefer ponds that have a lot of vegetation. These animals can generally be found in spring-fed streams, and they prefer clean, oxygenated water. The Eastern mud turtle rarely basks, but in the instance they do, they will bask on rocks or debris floating on the surface of the water. In the wild, they also prefer sandy and muddy areas, as they will hibernate by burrowing into the mud. The Eastern Mud Turtle prefers hibernacula sites about 70 meters from wetlands and that have a large amount of leaf and pine litter and not too much tree cover. They will burrow at the wetland edges at a minimum depth of 1.3 cm below the soil surface to a maximum depth of 3 cm. The leaf litter helps to keep the soil moisture and the temperature consistent, while a more open canopy exposes turtles to higher temperatures before emergence.

Mud turtles can tolerate brackish water so they may be found near salt marshes and on coastal islands. They can also persist in degraded or polluted habitats despite contamination.

== Reproduction ==
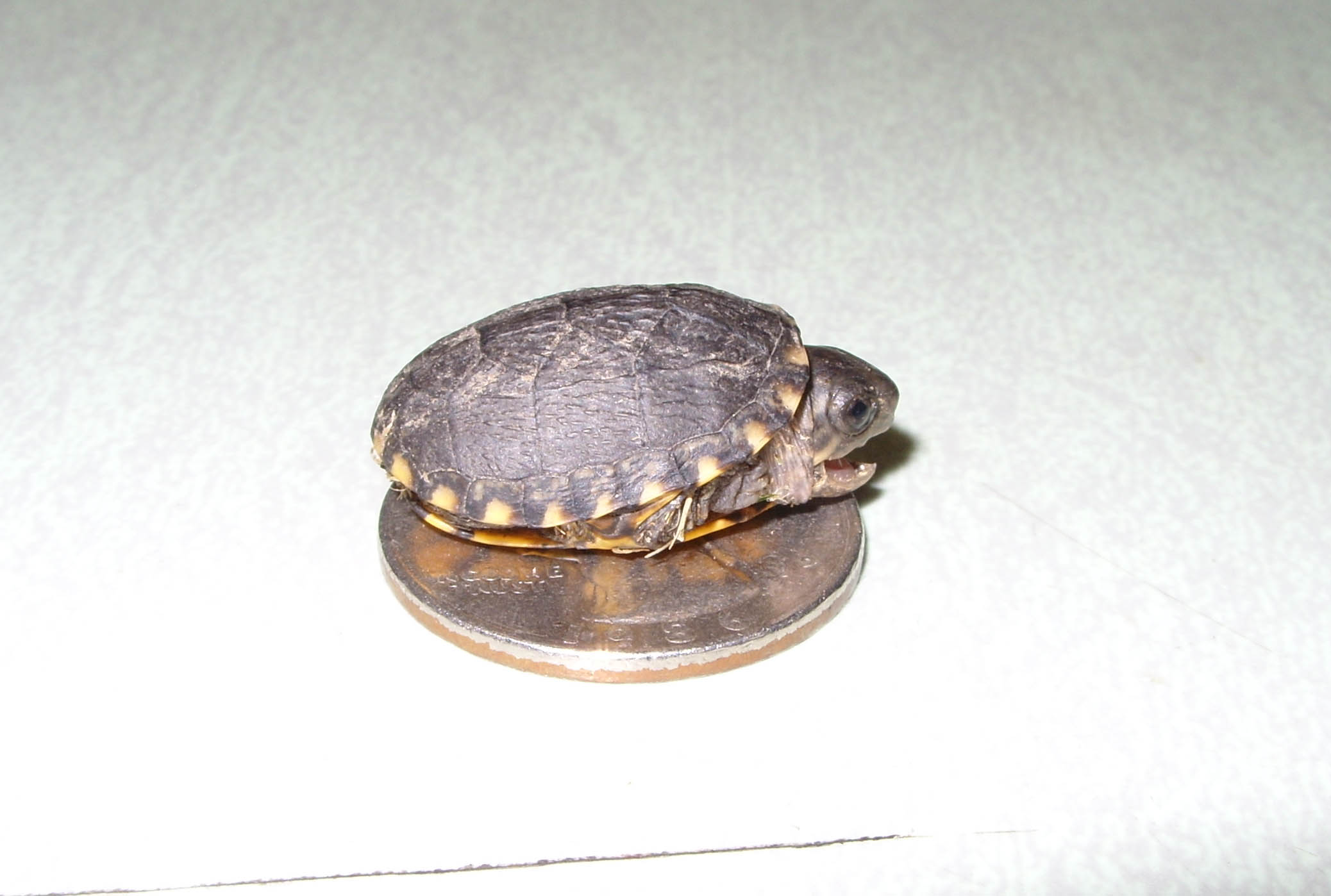
Hatchling

Mating occurs in K. subrubrum during early spring followed by egg laying in May to early June. Clutch sizes vary from 2 to 5. Clutch size increases as female plastron length increases and they have at least 3 clutches/year.

Reproduction in this species varies greatly depending on latitudinal location. The number of eggs per clutch is significantly higher at cooler latitudes. Clutches per year for this species have been reported to be one clutch per year in some states and multiple clutches in others. In a study conducted in South Carolina, clutch frequency in warmer areas averaged multiple clutches, but two clutches per year were the approximate average in cooler regions of the state. The survival rate from the time eggs are laid by Kinosternon until the hatchlings enter the aquatic environment (26.1%) is significantly higher than that for Trachemys species (10.5%). The turtles nest during rainstorms, bury themselves, and then wait for another rainstorm to go back to their non-nesting habitat. The incubation period of the eggs can range from 76 to 124 days. K. subrubrum hatchlings have a wider carapace than the width of the eggs they hatch from, indicating that the carapace unfolds immediately upon hatching.

== Geographic range ==
The eastern mud turtle is found in the US states of Alabama, Arkansas, Delaware, Florida, Georgia, Illinois, Indiana, Kentucky, Louisiana, Maryland, Mississippi, Missouri, New Jersey, New York, North Carolina, Oklahoma, Pennsylvania, South Carolina, Tennessee, Texas, and Virginia.

In Indiana, the eastern mud turtle is listed as an endangered species.

== Predation ==
Juveniles of this turtle are susceptible to predation by predators such as blue crabs (Callinectes sapidus), water snakes (Nerodia) and cottonmouths. Predators of adults include Virginia opossums, weasels (Mustela), raccoons, gray foxes, kingsnakes (Lampropeltis), bald eagles, red imported fire ants and alligators. Nest predation occurs by shrews and mostly mid-sized carnivorous mammals such as raccoons, skunks and foxes (gray foxes and red foxes).

== Diseases ==
In 2014 on the Savannah River Site in Aiken, South Carolina the first case of ranavirus in an eastern mud turtle was detected. This virus affects amphibians, fish, and reptiles and causes oral plaque, ulceration, and conjunctivitis in infected species eventually resulting in death. It is caused by FV3-like ranavirus, affecting amphibians and reptiles.

== Subspecies ==
Two subspecies are recognized as being valid, including the nominotypical subspecies.

- K. s. subrubrum (Bonnaterre, 1789) – eastern mud turtle (nominate subspecies)
- K. s. hippocrepis Gray, 1855 – Mississippi mud turtle

The former subspecies K. s. steindachneri (Siebenrock, 1906)--Florida mud turtle was elevated to species status in 2013.1

Nota bene: A trinomial authority in parentheses indicates that the subspecies was originally described in a genus other than Kinosternon.

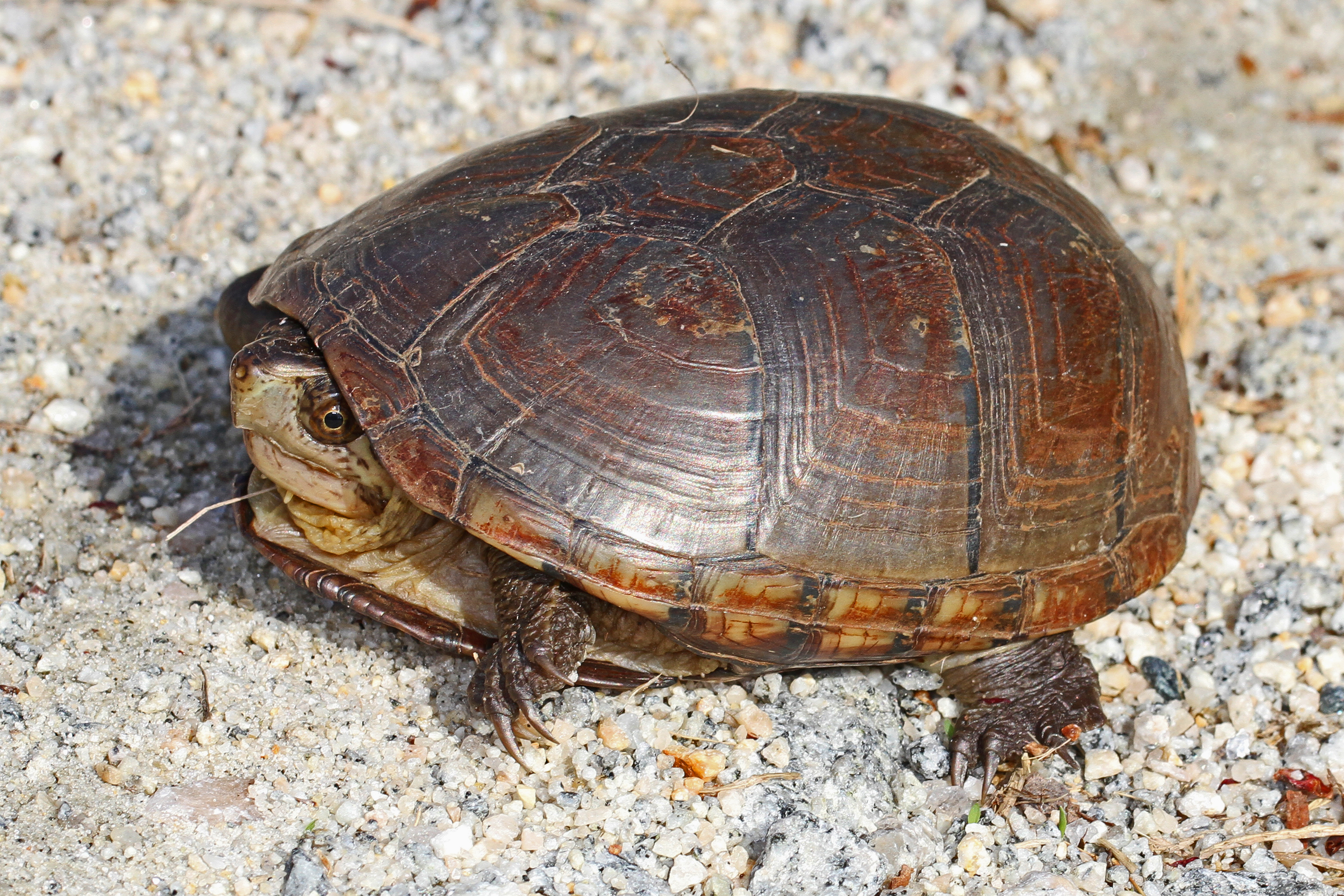
K. s. subrubrum, Delaware

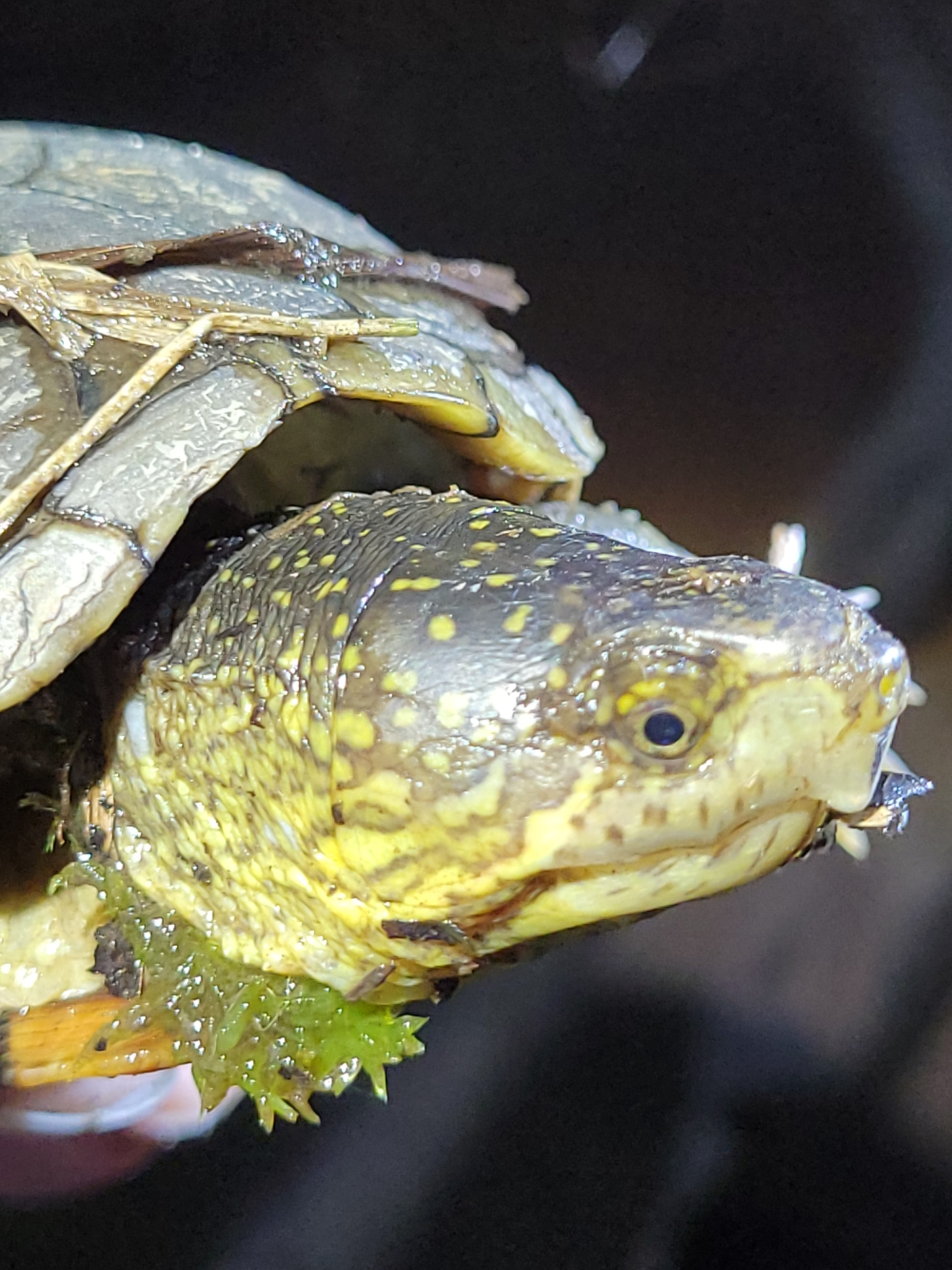
K. s. subrubrum, New Jersey

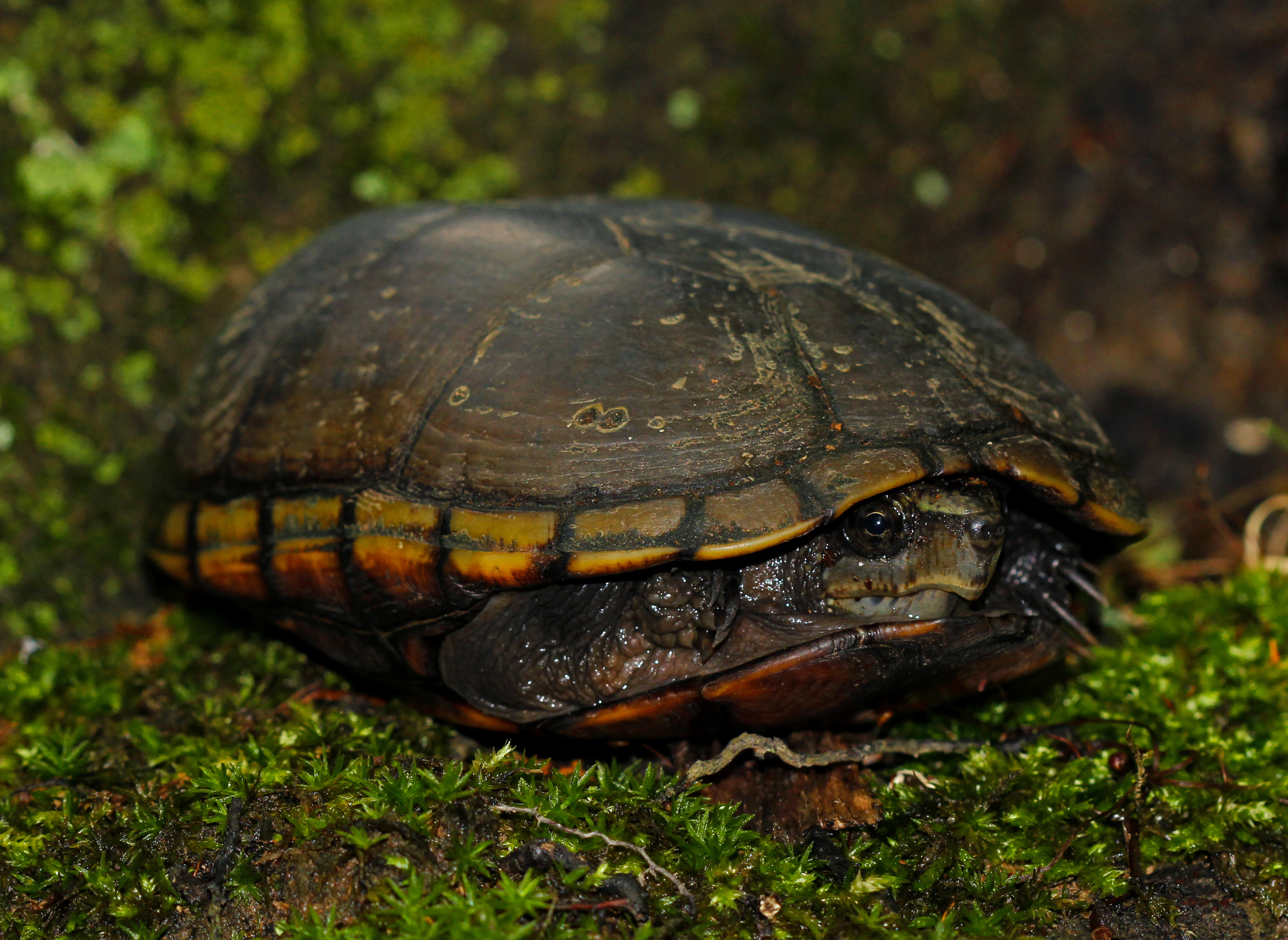
K. s. hippocrepis, Missouri

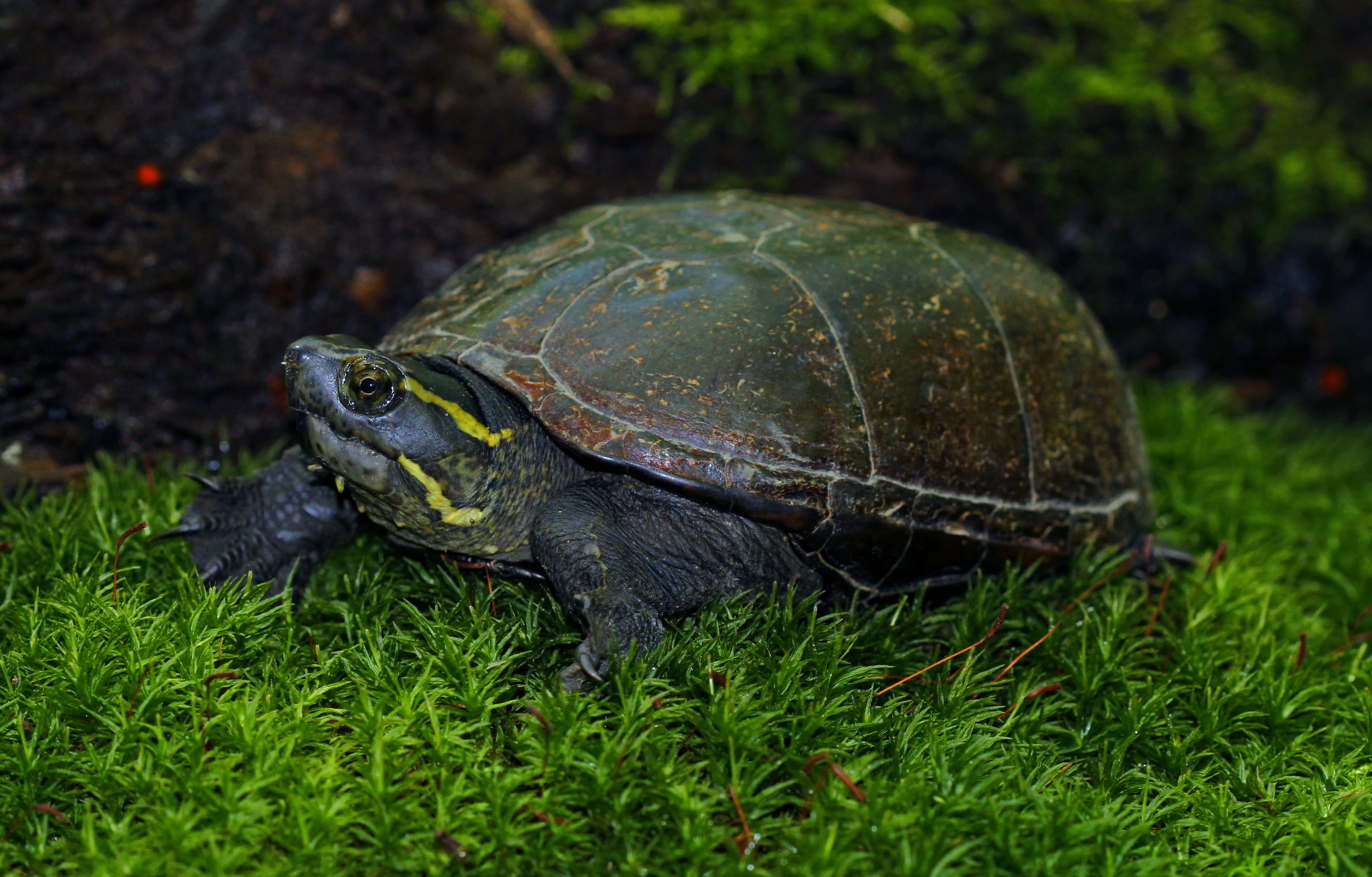
K. s. hippocrepis, Missouri

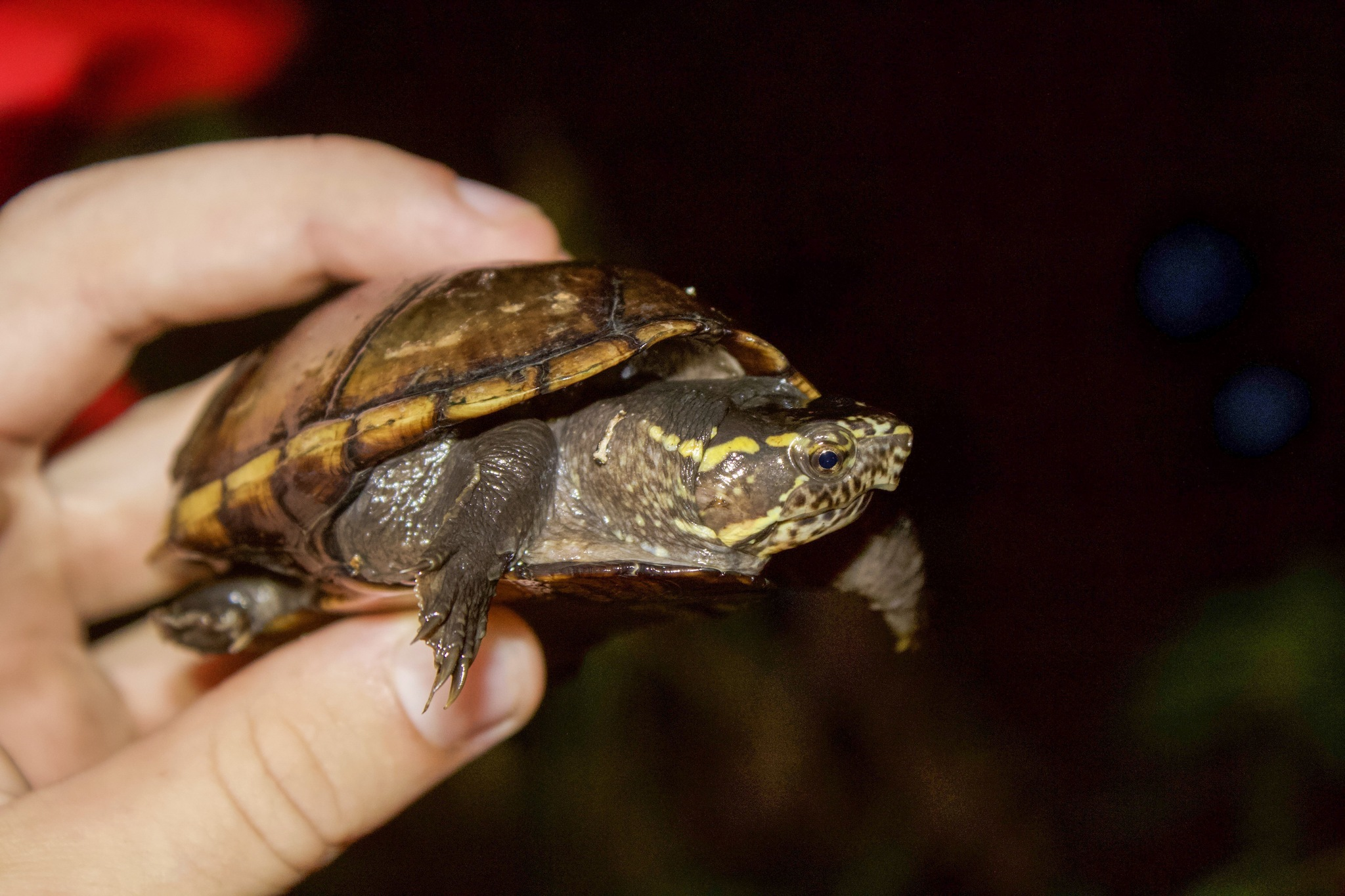
K. s. hippocrepis

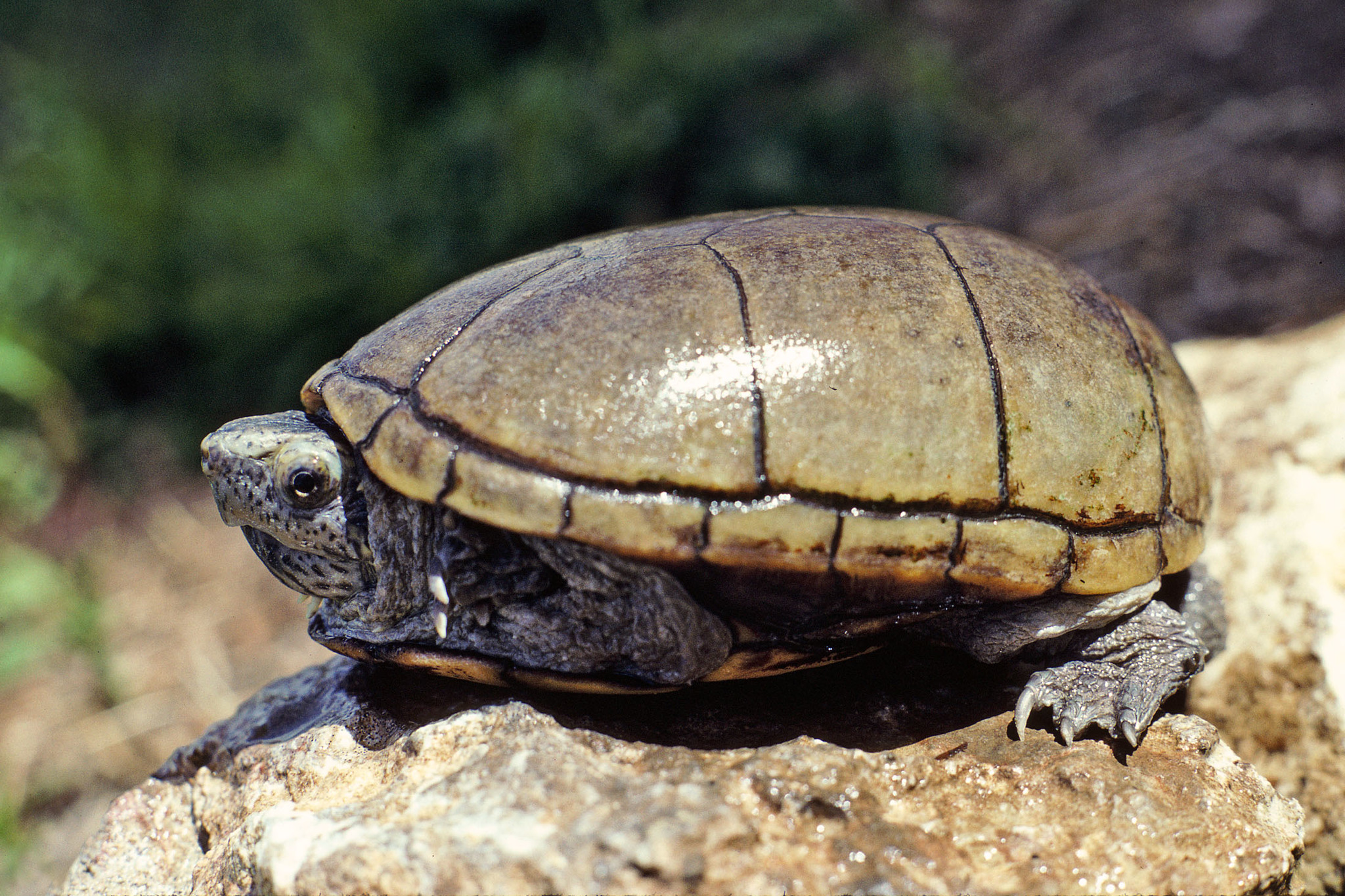
K. s. hippocrepis, Arkansas

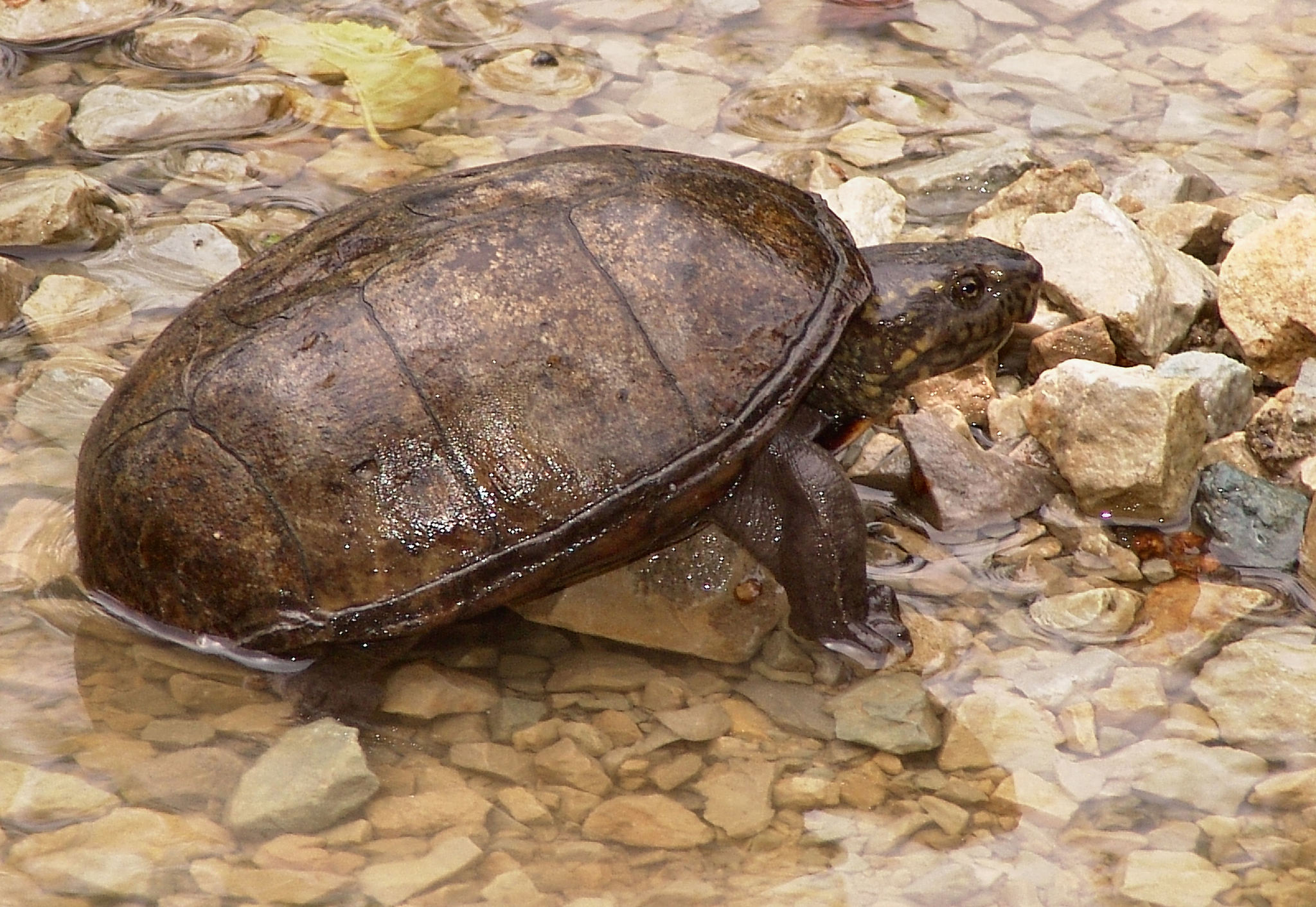
K. s. hippocrepis, Arkansas

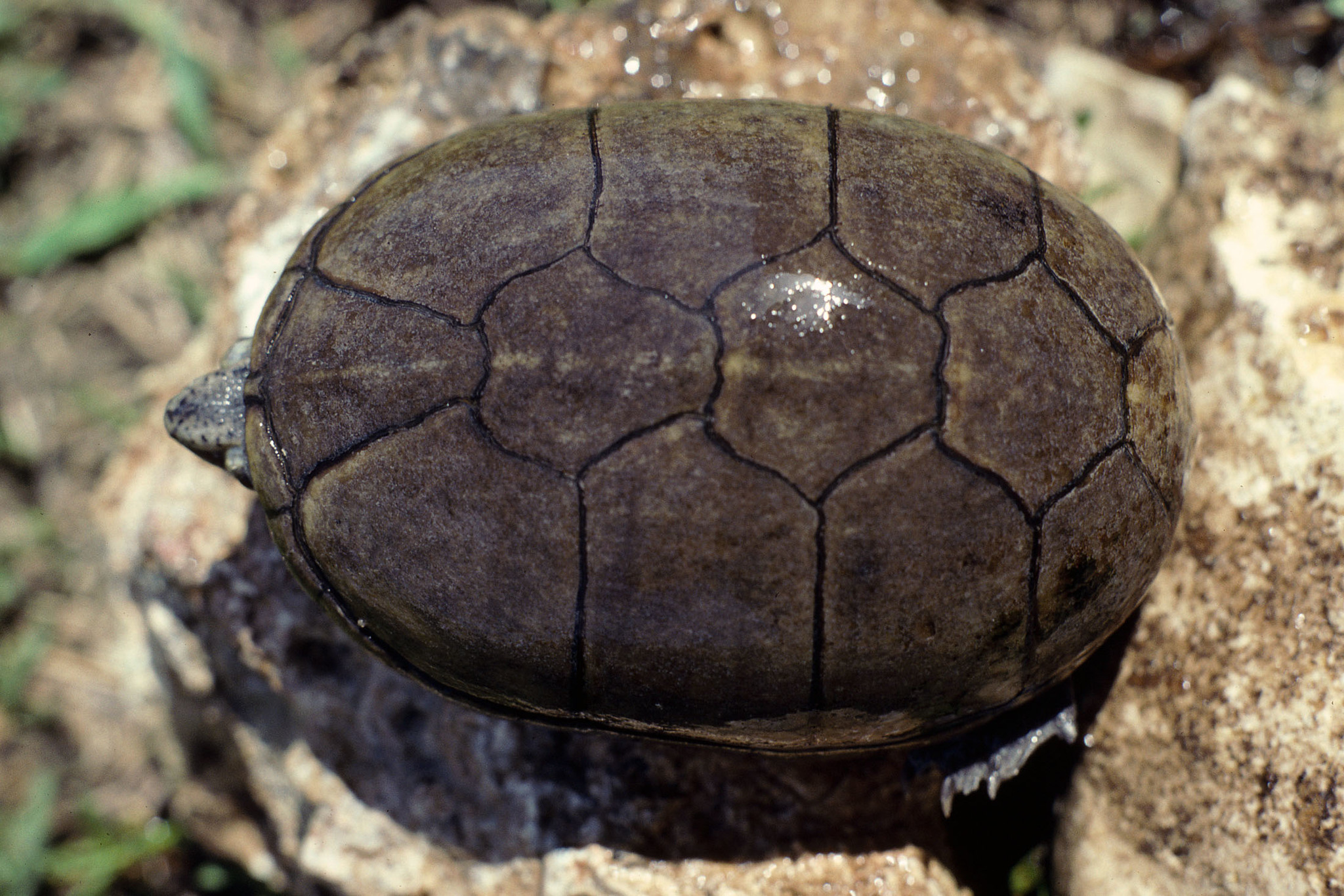
K. s. hippocrepis, Arkansas

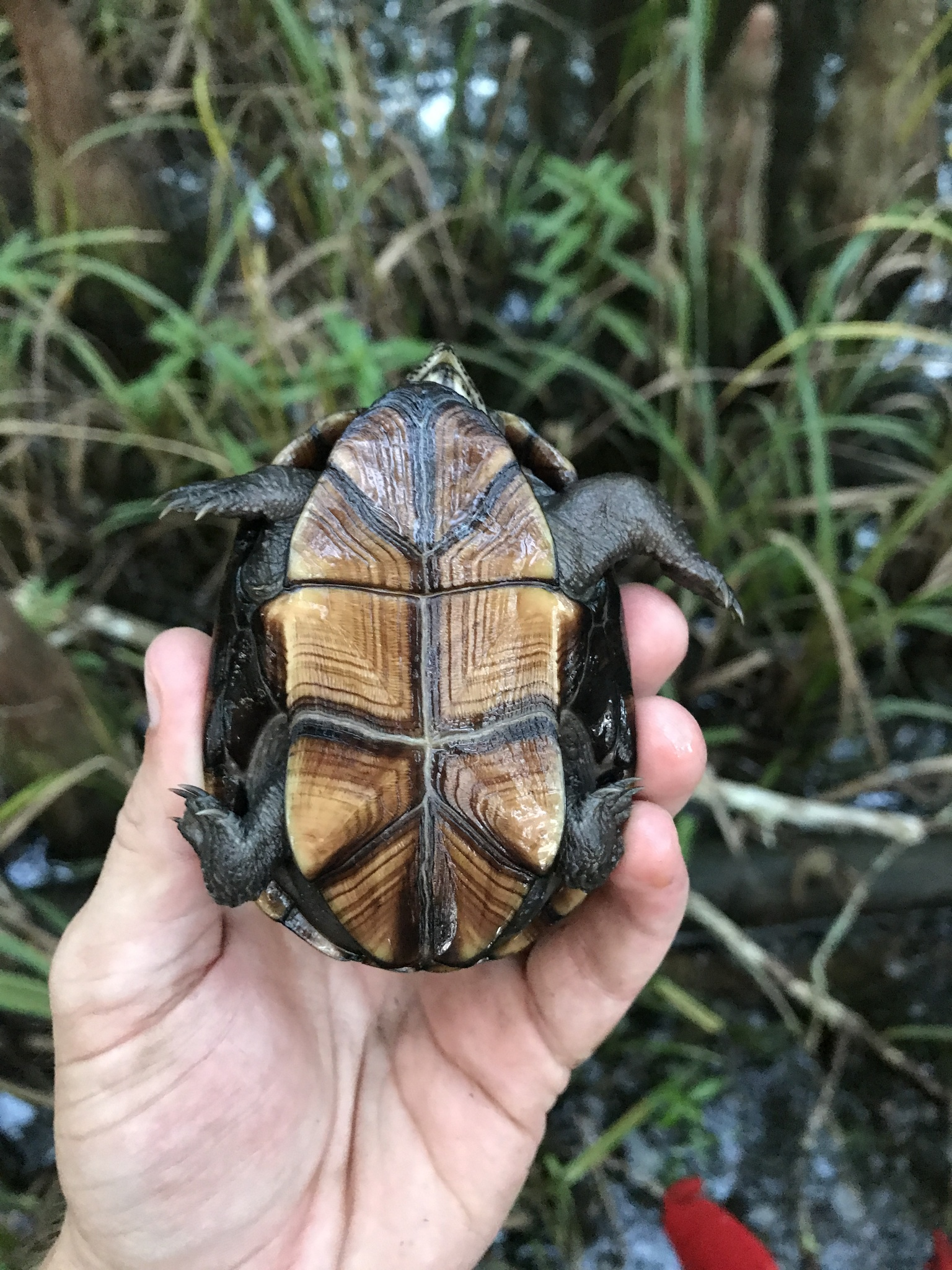
K. s. hippocrepis, Arkansas
