= Lymphocystis =

Viral disease in fish

Lymphocystis is a common viral disease of freshwater and saltwater fish. The virus that causes this disease belongs to the genus Lymphocystivirus of the family Iridoviridae.

Aquarists often come across this virus when their fish are stressed such as when put into a new environment and the virus is able to grow.

The fish start growing small white pin-prick like growths on their fins or skin and this is often mistaken for infection by Ichthyophthirius multifiliis in the early stages. It soon clumps together to form a cauliflower-like growth on the skin, mouth, fins, and occasionally the gills.

This virus appears to present itself as lesions at differing locations depending on the species of fish being attacked, often complicating initial diagnosis. Lesions at the base of the dorsal fin are common among freshwater species of Central American origin, most notably Herichthys carpintis; inside the mouth of Herichthys cyanoguttatus and Geophagus steindachneri; on the tail fin of koi, carp, and US native sunfish (Lepomis spp.); on the side flanks of walleye, sauger and flounder; on head or tail areas of common goldfish, and oranda variants.

Lymphocystis does show some host-specificity, i.e., each strain (or species) of lymphocystis can infect only its primary host fish, or some additional closely related, fish.

There is no known cure for this virus, though a privately owned fish research and breeding facility near Gainesville, Florida has reportedly been able to suppress the virus into remission using the human anti-DNA virus drug acyclovir at the rate of 200 mg per 10 US gallons for 2 days. Otherwise, some aquarists recommend surgery to remove the affected area if it is very serious, followed by an antibiotic bath treatment to prevent a secondary bacterial infection of the open wounds.

Eventually the growths inhibit the fish's ability to swim, breathe or eat, and secondary bacterial infections usually kill the fish.

Usually the best cure is to simply give the fish a stress-free life, a weekly bacteria treatment and the virus will slowly subside and the fins will repair themselves. This can take many months. Like most viral infections, even in humans, the first outbreaks are the most serious, whilst the immune system "learns" how to suppress it, the outbreaks become less severe over time assuming the organism survives the initial outbreaks.
