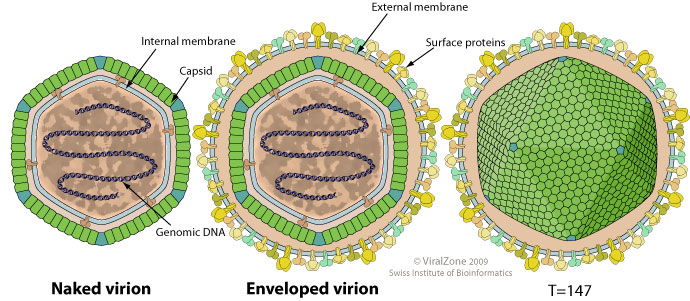
- Schematic drawings of Iridovirus virions
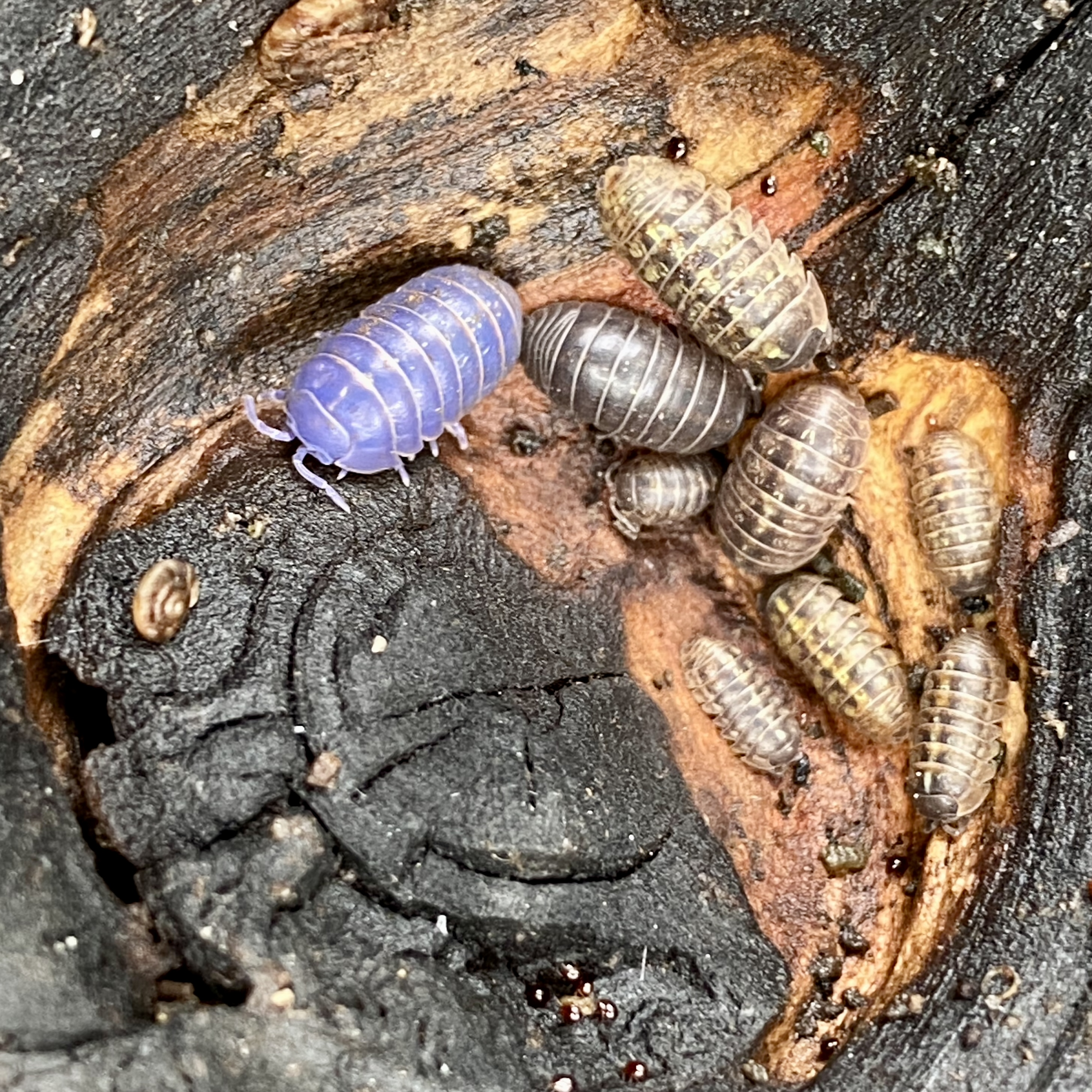
- Armadillidium vulgare symptomatic of Invertebrate iridescent virus 31 (above) among individuals with typical colouration (below)

Virus classification
- (unranked): Virus
- Realm: Varidnaviria
- Kingdom: Bamfordvirae
- Phylum: Nucleocytoviricota
- Class: Megaviricetes
- Order: Pimascovirales
- Family: Iridoviridae
- Subfamily: Betairidovirinae
- Genus: Iridovirus

Species
- See text

= Iridovirus =

Genus of viruses

Iridovirus is a genus of viruses in the family Iridoviridae. Arthropods serve as natural hosts. Currently, only two species are placed in this genus. Invertebrate iridescent virus 6 (IIV-6) was recognised as the type species until such a designation was abolished. IIV-6 is hosted by mosquitos and usually causes covert (inapparent) infection that reduces fitness. The other species Invertebrate iridescent virus 31 (IIV-31) is hosted by isopods and causes patent (apparent) infection characterised by blue to bluish-purple iridescence and a shortened lifespan.

== Taxonomy ==
The genus contains the following species, listed by scientific name and followed by the exemplar virus of the species:

- Iridovirus armadillidium1, Invertebrate iridescent virus 31
- Iridovirus chilo1, Invertebrate iridescent virus 6

Former species Invertebrate iridescent virus 1 (IIV-1) has been removed from Iridovirus. Its current status is a tentative member of Chloriridovirus.

== Structure ==
Viruses in Iridovirus are enveloped, with icosahedral and polyhedral geometries, and T=147 symmetry. Their diameter is around 185 nm. Genomes are linear, around 213 kb in length. The genome codes for 211 proteins.

Genus	Structure	Symmetry	Genomic arrangement	Genomic segmentation
Iridovirus	Polyhedral	T=147	Linear	Monopartite

== Life cycle ==
Viral replication is nucleocytoplasmic. Entry into the host cell is achieved by attachment of the viral proteins to host receptors, which mediates endocytosis. Replication follows the DNA strand displacement model. DNA-templated transcription is the method of transcription. Invertebrates serve as their natural hosts.

Genus	Host details	Tissue tropism	Entry details	Release details	Replication site	Assembly site	Transmission
Iridovirus	Arthropods	None	Cell receptor endocytosis	Lysis; budding	Nucleus	Cytoplasm	Contact
