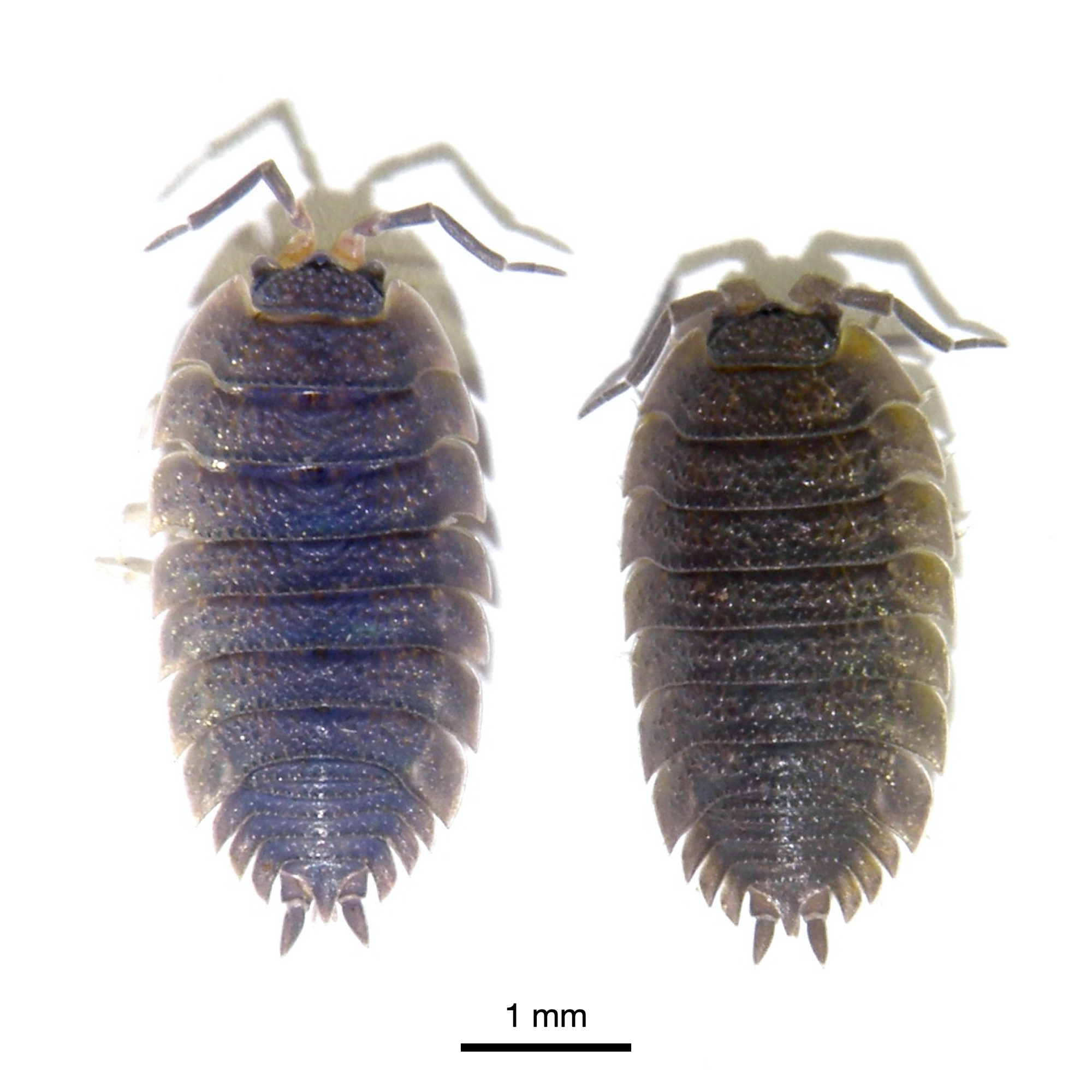
- Porcellio scaber infected with Invertebrate iridescent virus 31 (L) and individual with typical colouration (R) for comparison

Virus classification
- (unranked): Virus
- Realm: Varidnaviria
- Kingdom: Bamfordvirae
- Phylum: Nucleocytoviricota
- Class: Megaviricetes
- Order: Pimascovirales
- Family: Iridoviridae
- Subfamily: Betairidovirinae

Genera
- See text

= Betairidovirinae =

Subfamily of viruses

Betairidovirinae is a subfamily of viruses in the family Iridoviridae that was established in 2016. It is one of two subfamilies within this family, the other being Alphairdovirinae. Most species within the Betairidovirinae are hosted by invertebrates, whereas all species within the Alphairdovirinae are hosted by 'cold-blooded' vertebrates (namely; fishes, amphibians, and reptiles). As such, viruses in this subfamily may be called invertebrate iridescent viruses (IIVs) or invertebrate iridoviruses.

== Genera ==
The subfamily consists of the following four genera, although many additional putative and partially characterised taxa are known:

- Chloriridovirus
- Daphniairidovirus
- Decapodiridovirus
- Iridovirus

== Hosts ==
The Betairidovirinae are hosted by invertebrates, but some research indicates they may also be hosted by vertebrates, and that at least one invertebrate-hosted iridovirus is actually more closely related to the Alphairdovirinae. Most Betairidovirinae hosts are arthropods, especially insects and woodlice, but other arthropods and even several non-arthropod hosts are known. Some viruses are hosted by a single host species; others are generalists that can infect multiple species.

== Disease ==
Some species within this subfamily cause no externally obvious disease. Others cause a generalised reduction in fitness. Invertebrate iridoviral diseases are most noted for some species that cause iridescence in their hosts because icosahedral virions may accumulate in high density in the tissues of the host, forming a paracrystalline array that reflects particular wavelengths of light. Iridescent blue is most common, but colours across the spectrum have been observed. Most species with smaller virions produce colours toward the violet side of the colour spectrum, whereas larger virions tend toward the red side.

== See also ==
- Cypovirus – members of this genus may also cause iridescence
