= Chloriridovirus =

Virus classification
- (unranked): Virus
- Realm: Varidnaviria
- Kingdom: Bamfordvirae
- Phylum: Nucleocytoviricota
- Class: Megaviricetes
- Order: Pimascovirales
- Family: Iridoviridae
- Subfamily: Betairidovirinae
- Genus: Chloriridovirus

Genus of viruses

Chloriridovirus is a genus of viruses, in the family Iridoviridae. Diptera with aquatic larval stage, mainly mosquitoes, lepidoptera, and orthoptera insects serve as natural hosts. There are five species in this genus. Diseases associated with this genus include: yellow-green iridescence beneath the epidermis (early mosquito larval stages are most susceptible to infection). Death rates are highest in the fourth instar. Viruses within this genus have been found to infect mosquito larvae, in which they produce various iridescent colors.

== Taxonomy ==
The genus contains the following species, listed by scientific name and followed by the exemplar virus of the species:

- Chloriridovirus aedes1, Invertebrate iridescent virus 3
- Chloriridovirus anopheles1, Anopheles minimus iridovirus
- Chloriridovirus simulium1, Invertebrate iridescent virus 22
- Chloriridovirus simulium2, Invertebrate iridescent virus 25
- Chloriridovirus wiseana1, Invertebrate iridescent virus 9

== Structure ==
Viruses in the genus Chloriridovirus are enveloped, with icosahedral and polyhedral geometries, and T=189-217 symmetry. The diameter is around 180 nm. Genomes are linear, around 135kb in length. The genome codes for 126 proteins.

| Genus | Structure | Symmetry | Capsid | Genomic arrangement | Genomic segmentation |
|---|---|---|---|---|---|
| Chloriridovirus | Polyhedral | T=189-217 | | Linear | Monopartite |

== Life cycle ==
Viral replication is nucleo-cytoplasmic. Entry into the host cell is achieved by attachment of the viral proteins to host receptors, which mediates endocytosis. Replication follows the DNA strand displacement model. DNA-templated transcription is the method of transcription. Diptera with aquatic larval stage, mainly mosquitoes, lepidoptera, and orthoptera insects serve as the natural host.

| Genus | Host details | Tissue tropism | Entry details | Release details | Replication site | Assembly site | Transmission |
|---|---|---|---|---|---|---|---|
| Chloriridovirus | Diptera with aquatic larval stage, mainly mosquitoes | None | Cell receptor endocytosis | Budding | Nucleus | Cytoplasm | Unknown |
