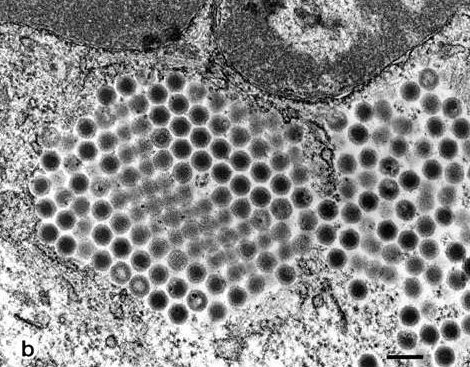
- TEM micrograph showing a cluster of Iridovirus virions

Virus classification
- (unranked): Virus
- Realm: Varidnaviria
- Kingdom: Bamfordvirae
- Phylum: Nucleocytoviricota
- Class: Megaviricetes
- Order: Pimascovirales
- Family: Iridoviridae

Subfamilies and genera
- See text

= Iridoviridae =

Family of viruses

Iridoviridae is a family of viruses with double-stranded DNA genomes. Amphibians, fish, and invertebrates such as arthropods serve as natural hosts. There are currently 23 species in this family, divided among two subfamilies and eight genera.

== Nomenclature ==
The name is derived from Iris, the Greek goddess of the rainbow. This name was chosen because of the "rainbow-like" iridescence observed in heavily infected insects and pelleted samples of invertebrate iridoviruses.

== Taxonomy ==
The following subfamilies and genera are recognized (-virinae denotes subfamily and -virus denotes genus):

- Alphairdovirinae
  - Lymphocystivirus
  - Megalocytivirus
  - Ranavirus
- Betairidovirinae
  - Bivalveiridovirus
  - Chloriridovirus
  - Daphniairidovirus
  - Decapodiridovirus
  - Iridovirus

== Structure ==
The virions are icosahedral with triangulation number (T) = 189–217, 120–350 nm in diameter and made up of three domains: an outer proteinaceous capsid, an intermediate lipid membrane, and a central core containing DNA-protein complexes. Some of the viruses also have an outer envelope. The presence or absence of an envelope depends on whether they budded from the cell membrane (enveloped viruses) or were arranged in paracrystalline arrays within the host cell cytoplasm and then were released by cell lysis (unenveloped viruses).

The linear genome varies between 150 and 303 kilobases in length. It contains terminal and redundant sequences and is circularly permuted.

Members of this family differ in their degree of genome methylation. The genera Chloriridovirus and Iridovirus lack a highly methylated genome. Members of Lymphocystivirus, Megalocytivirus, and Ranavirus have genomes with about 25% of their cytosine residues methylated by a virally encoded DNA methyltransferase.

Genus	Structure	Symmetry	Genomic arrangement	Genomic segmentation
Lymphocystivirus	Polyhedral	T=189–217	Linear	Monopartite
Megalocytivirus	Polyhedral	T=189–217	Linear	Monopartite
Ranavirus	Polyhedral	T=133 or 147	Linear	Monopartite
Iridovirus	Polyhedral	T=147	Linear	Monopartite
Chloriridovirus	Polyhedral	T=189–217	Linear	Monopartite

=== Gene expression ===
Similar to the herpes viruses, transcription occurs in three stages: immediate-early, delayed-early, and late. Positive induction and negative feedback mechanisms exist in each stage, mediated by products of the other stages.

=== Replication ===
Virus particles enter the cell and uncoating occurs. The viral DNA is transported to the host cell nucleus, where it is transcribed by host RNA polymerase II modified by the virus. Meanwhile, host macromolecular synthesis ceases.

Parental DNA produces a genome which is then the template for replication in the cytoplasm. Large concatemers of viral DNA are formed by recombination in the cytoplasm. Packaging of the new genomes into virions occurs in the cytoplasm and the virus is released either by budding from the cell membrane or cell lysis.

Genus	Host details	Tissue tropism	Entry details	Release details	Replication site	Assembly site	Transmission
Lymphocystivirus	Fish	None	Cell receptor endocytosis	Lysis; budding	Nucleus	Cytoplasm	Unknown
Megalocytivirus	Fish	None	Cell receptor endocytosis	Lysis; budding	Nucleus	Cytoplasm	Unknown
Ranavirus	Frogs; snakes	None	Cell receptor endocytosis	Lysis; budding	Nucleus	Cytoplasm	Contact
Iridovirus	Insects	None	Cell receptor endocytosis	Lysis; budding	Nucleus	Cytoplasm	Contact
Chloriridovirus	Diptera with aquatic larval stage, mainly mosquitoes	None	Cell receptor endocytosis	Budding	Nucleus	Cytoplasm	Unknown

=== DNA repair ===
Members of the Iridoviridae appear to have the capability to repair DNA damages.

== Pathogenesis ==
Little is known about the pathogenesis of iridoviruses. The pathogenesis is however, temperature dependent, important since iridoviruses appear to be confined to poikilothermic hosts.

== Host range ==
Members of the Iridoviridae family infect mainly invertebrates, but also some vertebrate species such as fish, amphibians and reptiles.
