= Terminally redundant DNA =

DNA that contains repeated sequences at each end

Terminally redundant DNA is DNA that contains repeated sequences at each end called terminal repeats. These ends are used (e.g. in virus T4) to join the ends of the linear DNA to form a cyclic DNA. The term was coined by Dr. Michael London in 1964.
