= Concatemer =

Type of DNA molecule

A concatemer is a long continuous DNA molecule that contains multiple copies of the same DNA sequence linked in series. These polymeric molecules are usually copies of an entire genome linked end to end and separated by cos sites (a protein binding nucleotide sequence that occurs once in each copy of the genome). Concatemers are frequently the result of rolling circle replication, and may be seen in the late stage of infection of bacteria by phages. As an example, if the genes in the phage DNA are arranged ABC, then in a concatemer the genes would be ABCABCABCABC and so on (assuming synthesis was initiated between genes C and A). They are further broken by ribozymes.

During active infection, some species of viruses have been shown to replicate their genetic material via the formation of concatemers. In the case of human herpesvirus-6, its entire genome is made over and over on a single strand. These long concatemers are subsequently cleaved between the pac-1 and pac-2 regions by ribozymes when the genome is packaged into individual virions.

Bacteriophage T4 replicating DNA was labeled with tritiated thymidine and examined by autoradiography. The observed DNA replication intermediates included circular and branched circular concatemeric structures that likely arose by rolling circle replication.

When assembling concatemers from synthetic oligonucleotides, increasing salt concentration to 200 mM was found to be a major optimizing factor due to its ability to enhance ionic strength, which hastened the formation of concatemers.

== Mechanism/ replication ==
In addition to rolling circle replication, many DNA viruses employ recombination-dependent replication to produce concatemers. In this mechanism, replication is initiated at multiple sites, followed by strand invasion and homologous recombination, which join replication forks and generate long tandem repeats. Some viruses initiate multiple consecutive reinitiation events at genomic termini, which lead to overlapping replication rounds that effectively result in concatemer formation.

Concatemers, especially when unresolved, can contribute to genomic instability and rearrangements. Tandem duplication, unequal, crossover, and insertion/deletion may occur. Over time, concatemers may seed new tandem repeat arrays or satellite DNA, and in viruses, variation in concatemer length can drive genetic diversity.

== Mitochondria ==
In yeast S. cerevisiae concatamers are an essential part of the process for packaging DNA. We know this because of experiments done on the yeast S cerevisiae cells.

-There are two ways that concatamers are formed, rolling circle replication and crossing over.

-Mhr1 is a protein that starts the rolling circle replication for mitochondrial DNA in the yeast.

-CCE1 is a protein that helps with crossing over.

-If the gene for Mhr1 is overexpressed there will be more concatamers, if it is disrupted by a mutation there will be fewer concatamers.

-If both the MHR1 gene and CCE1 genes are disrupted by mutations, concatamers will not be able to form and the cell will have no mitochondrial DNA. Mitochondrial DNA will not form without concatamers. That proves that they are necessary for mitochondrial DNA.

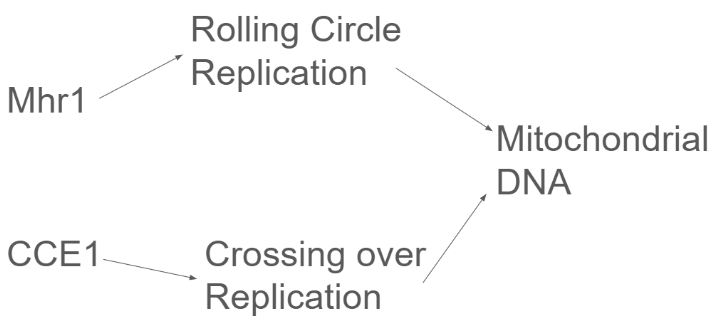

== Rolling circle DNA replication ==
One of the ways concatamers are formed is through rolling circle replication. In rolling circle replication the outer strand of DNA is cut at an origin. That strand is peeled off its complementary strand. As it is fully peeled off, DNA replicase will attach nucleotides to the inner strand to replace the peeled strand. Once the strand is fully peeled DNA replicase can bind nucleotides so that it will have a complementary strand. After the process, there will be two strands of DNA with their complements.

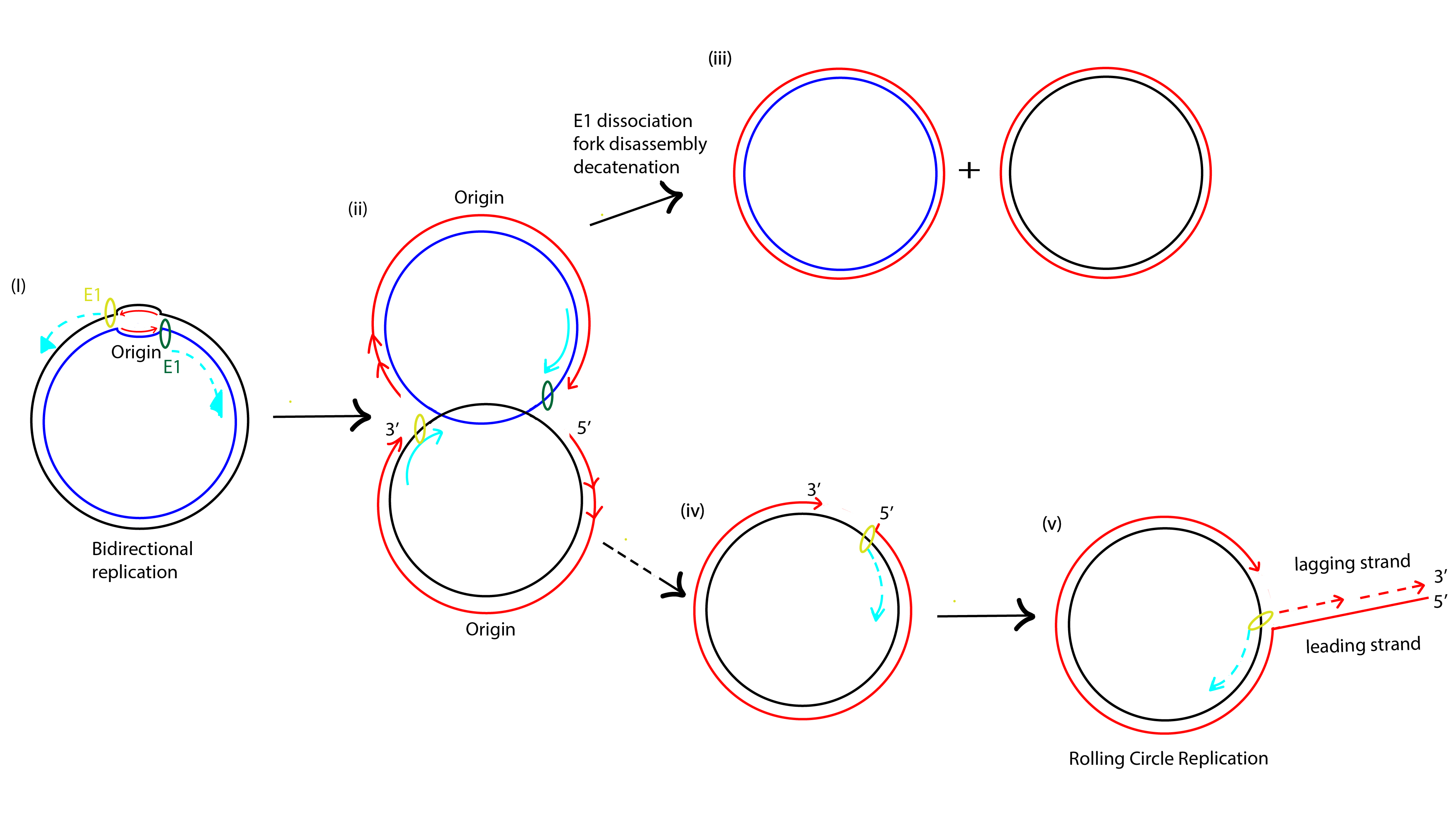
Rolling Circle Replication

== Bibliography ==
- Oxford Dictionary of Biochemistry and Molecular Biology, 2nd ed. R. l., eds. Oxford University Press, 2006. p. 138.
