= Pimascovirales =

Virus classification
- (unranked): Virus
- Realm: Varidnaviria
- Kingdom: Bamfordvirae
- Phylum: Nucleocytoviricota
- Class: Megaviricetes
- Order: Pimascovirales

Order of viruses

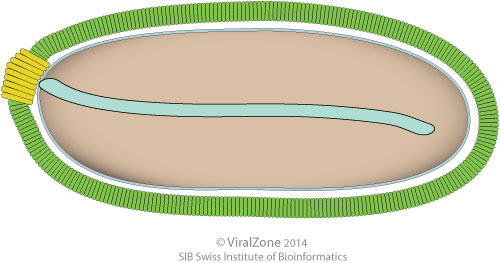
Pithovirus Virion diagram

Pimascovirales is an order of viruses. The term is a portmanteau of a portmanteau of pitho-, irido-, marseille-, and ascoviruses.

== Families ==
Pimascovirales contains six families, three of which are assigned to a suborder. This taxonomy is shown hereafter:

- Suborder: Ocovirineae
  - Hydriviridae
  - Orpheoviridae
  - Pithoviridae
- Families not assigned to a suborder:
  - Ascoviridae
  - Iridoviridae
  - Marseilleviridae
