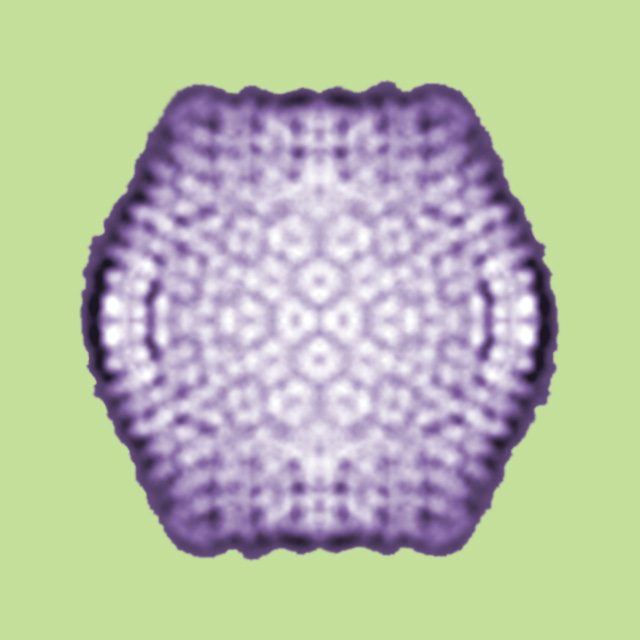

Virus classification
- (unranked): Virus
- Realm: Varidnaviria
- Kingdom: Bamfordvirae
- Phylum: Preplasmiviricota
- Class: Virophaviricetes
- Order: Mividavirales
- Family: Sputniviroviridae
- Genus: Sputnikvirus
- Species: Sputnikvirus mimiviri

Member virus
- Sputnik 1; Sputnik 2; Sputnik 3

= Sputnik virophage =

Subviral agent

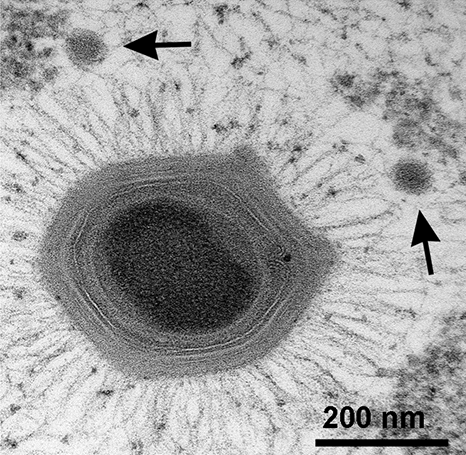
A mimivirus with two satellite Sputnik virophages (arrows)

Sputnik virophage (from Russian спутник "satellite") is a subviral agent that reproduces in amoeba cells that are already infected by a certain helper virus; Sputnik uses the helper virus's machinery for reproduction and inhibits replication of the helper virus. It is known as a virophage, in analogy to the term bacteriophage.

Viruses like Sputnik that depend on co-infection of the host cell by helper viruses are known as satellite viruses. At its discovery in a Paris water-cooling tower in 2008, Sputnik was the first known satellite virus that inhibited replication of its helper virus and thus acted as a parasite of that virus. In analogy, it was called a virophage.

Sputnik virophages were found infecting giant viruses of Mimiviridae group A. However, they are able to grow in amoebae infected by Mimiviridae of any of the groups A, B, and C.

== Virology ==
Sputnik was first isolated in 2008 from a sample obtained from humans; it was harvested from the contact lens fluid of an individual with keratitis. Naturally however, the Sputnik virophage has been found to multiply inside species of the opportunistically pathogenic protozoan Acanthamoeba, but only if that amoeba is infected with the large mamavirus. Sputnik harnesses mamavirus proteins to rapidly produce new copies of itself.

Mamavirus is formally known as Acanthamoeba polyphaga mimivirus (APMV) and is a close relative of the previously known mimivirus. Mimivirus is a giant in the viral world; it has more genes than many bacteria and performs functions that normally occur only in cellular organisms. Mamavirus is even larger than mimivirus, but the two are very similar in that they form large viral factories and complex viral particles. There are conditions in which Sputnik cannot produce new virions within these viruses however. It has been observed that when Mimivirus is cultured with germ-free amoeba, bald virions are produced that lack the surface fibers that are characteristic of this virus. For reasons unknown, Sputnik is unable to replicate and produce new virions in these bald viruses. Virophage growth is deleterious to APMV and results in the production of abortive forms and abnormal capsid assembly of APMV. In one of the experiments done by inoculating Acanthamoeba polyphaga with water containing an original strain of APMV, it was discovered that several capsid layers accumulate asymmetrically on one side of the viral particle causing the virus to become ineffective. Sputnik decreased the yield of infective viral particle by 70% and also reduced the amoeba lysis by threefold at 24h.

Sputnik has a circular double stranded DNA genome consisting of 18,343 base pairs. It contains genes able to infect all three domains of life: Eukarya, Archaea and Bacteria. Of the twenty-one predicted protein-coding genes, three are apparently derived from APMV itself, one is a homologue of an archaeal virus, and four others are homologues of proteins in bacteriophages and eukaryotic viruses. The fact that three of these genes are derived from APMV indicates that Sputnik is able to participate in gene-transfer processes and mediate lateral gene transfer between giant viruses. Thirteen are ORFans, that is they do not have any detectable homologues in current sequence databases. The Sputnik genome has a high AT-content (73%), similar to that of APMV. It contains 16 predicted hairpin loops, all but two of which fall between ORFs.

Several other homologues such as those of a helicase-primase, a packaging ATPase, an insertion sequence transposase DNA-binding subunit, and a Zn-ribbon protein, were detected in the Global Ocean Survey environmental data set, suggesting that virophages could be a currently unknown family of viruses.

Sputnik was found to contain genes that were shared by APMV. These genes could have been acquired by Sputnik after the association of APMV with the host and then interaction between the virophage and the viral host. Recombination within the viral factory might have resulted in the exchange of genes. Sputnik is one of the most convincing pieces of evidence for gene mixing and matching between viruses.

The presence of these genes homologous to the mimivirus in Sputnik suggests that gene transfer between Sputnik and the mimivirus can occur during the infection of Acanthamoeba. Therefore, it is hypothesized that the virophage could be a source of vehicle mediating lateral gene transfer between giant viruses, which constitute a significant part of the DNA virus population in marine environments. Moreover, the presence of three APMV genes in Sputnik implies that gene transfer between a virophage and a giant virus is crucial to viral evolution.

== Structure ==
The Sputnik virophage has a capsid 74 nm in diameter, with icosahedral symmetry. Within each asymmetric unit of the structure, there are 4 and 1/3 hexon capsomers. On the 3-fold axis lies one hexon which gives rise to the 1/3 hexon in each asymmetric unit. There are flexible, mushroom-like fibers that protrude from each hexamer. Each asymmetric unit also houses 1/5 of a penton which lies on each 5-fold axis. In the middle of the pentamers are cavities that may allow for the entry or exit of DNA. Sputnik has a triangulation number of 27 with 260 hexamers and 12 pentamers. This virus does not contain a lipid membrane which goes against what has been previously reported.

== Other viruses of Sputnik genus ==
Genus Sputnikvirus has two species, which can be divided further into strains:

- Species Mimivirus-dependent virus Sputnik (Sputnikvirus mimiviri). All three Sputnik virophages share more than 99% of their DNA and can grow with viruses of any Mimiviridae group A, B, and C.
  - Sputnik 1 was discovered in 2008. Its host is Mamavirus.
  - Sputnik 2 was discovered in 2012. It can infect Acanthamoeba polyphaga Lentille virus (Mimiviridae group A).
  - Sputnik 3 was discovered in 2013. It was isolated with Mimivirus reporter (which is not its natural viral host).
- Species Mimivirus-dependent virus Zamilon (Sputnikvirus zamilonense). Cannot infect group A due to a MIMIVIRE defense system.
  - Zamilon 1 was discovered in 2013 in Tunisia.
  - Zamilon 2 was discovered in 2015 in North America.

== Other virophages ==
In March 2011, two additional virophages were described: the Mavirus virophage which preys on the giant Cafeteria roenbergensis virus, and the Organic Lake virophage (OLV), found in the salty Organic Lake in Antarctica, and which preys on phycodnaviruses that attack algae. Zamilon virophage was the first one found infecting a member of Mimiviridae group C (i. e. Mont1 virus), being able to grow also in Mimiviridae group B, but not group A.

All host viruses of the known virophages belong to the group of nucleocytoplasmic large DNA viruses. Studies have been done to show similarities among the various virophages. Homologous genes among virophages include putative FtsK-HerA family DNA packaging ATPase (ATPase), putative DNA helicase/primase (HEL/PRIM), putative cysteine protease (PRSC), putative MCP, and putative minor capsid protein (mCP). These genes are also referred to as conserved core genes although there is sometimes no or very little sequence similarity among these virophages.

== See also ==
- Satellite (biology)
- Mamavirus
- Zamilon virophage
