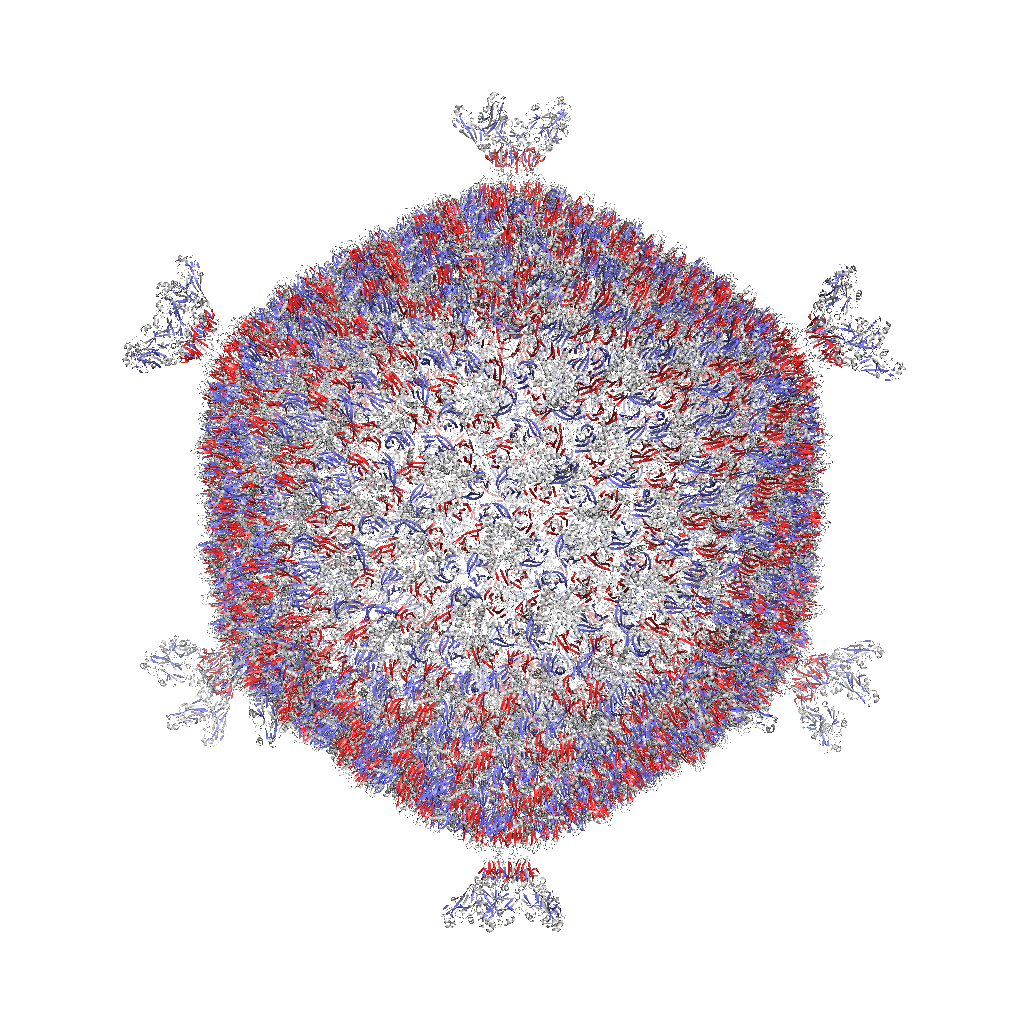
- The assembled capsid made of P2 and P3 proteins.

Virus classification
- (unranked): Virus
- Realm: Varidnaviria
- Kingdom: Abadenavirae
- Phylum: Produgelaviricota
- Class: Belvinaviricetes
- Order: Vinavirales
- Family: Corticoviridae
- Genus: Merivirus

= Merivirus =

Genus of viruses

Merivirus is a genus of viruses that is the sole genus in the family Corticoviridae. Meriviruses are bacteriophages; that is, their natural hosts are bacteria. The genus contains two species. From 1981 to 2024, the genus was named Corticovirus, sharing a name with its family. Prophages closely related to bacteriophage PM2 are abundant in the genomes of aquatic bacteria, suggesting that the ecological importance of meriviruses might be underestimated. Bacteriophage PM2 was first described in 1968 after isolation from seawater sampled from the coast of Chile.

== Taxonomy ==
The genus contains the following species:

- Merivirus Cr39582
- Merivirus PM2

== Virology ==
The virions consist of a round, icosahedral, non-enveloped capsid of a diameter of 60 nm and an internal lipid membrane located between outer and inner protein shell. The shells are composed of three layers whose surfaces reveals a pattern with distinctive features, including bush-like spikes protruding from the twelve vertices.

The icosahedral capsid (T = 21) is 56 nanometers (nm) in diameter and is composed of 1200 P1 (spike) and 60 P2 (capsid) proteins. The pentameric receptor-binding spikes protrude from the 12 fivefold axes. The capsid encloses an internal lipid core containing the structural proteins P3 to P9.

== Genome ==
The genome is not segmented, constitutes 13% of the virus's weight and contains a single molecule of circular, supercoiled, double-stranded DNA of 10 kilobases in length. The genome has a g + c content of 43%. It encodes 21 proteins.

The genome is organised into three operons.

Replication of the genome is via a rolling-circle mechanism, initiated by the virus encoded endonuclease P12.

== Life cycle ==
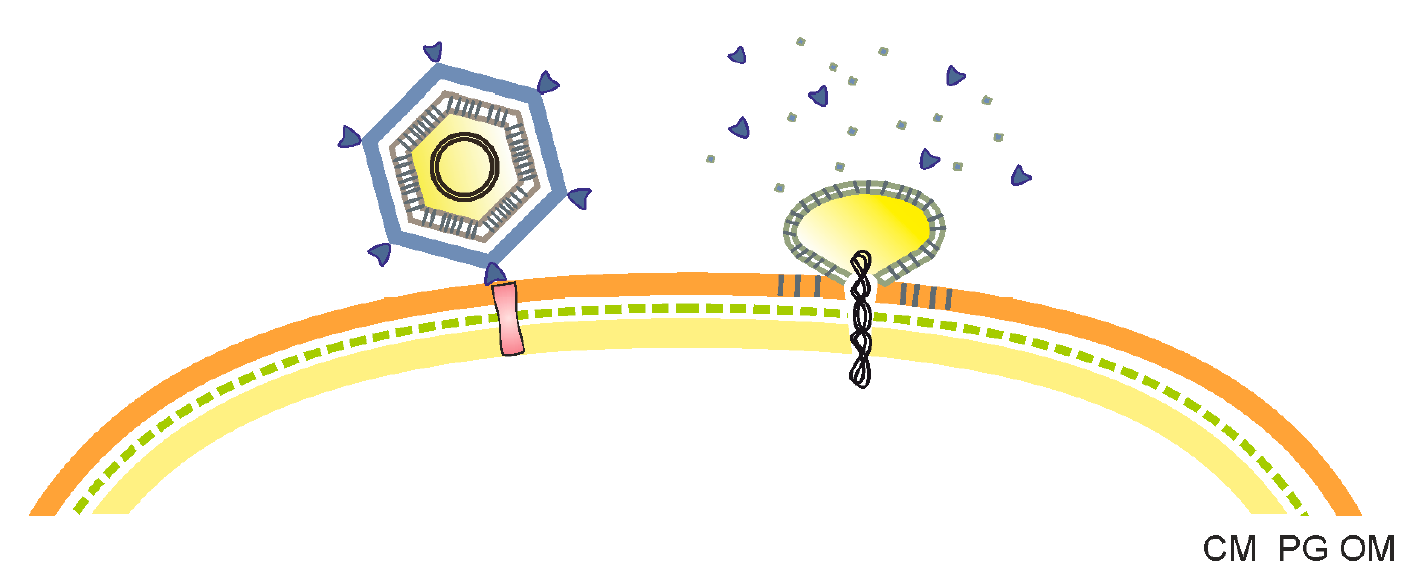
Entry mechanism of Bacteriophage PM2

Viral replication is cytoplasmic. Entry into the host cell is achieved by adsorption to the host cell surface followed by fusion of the viral membrane with the outer membrane of the host cell and subsequent genome delivery into the cell interior. DNA-templated transcription is the method of transcription. Bacteria of the genera Pseudoalteromonas, Marinomonas and Vibrio serve as the natural host. Bacteriophage PM2 is a lytic virus and at the end of the infection cycle disrupts the host cell using a unique lysis system consisting of phage-encoded proteins P17 and P18 as well as an unidentified host autolysin. However, identification of PM2-like proviruses in bacterial genomes indicates that other members of this family might be temperate viruses. Transmission routes are passive diffusion.
