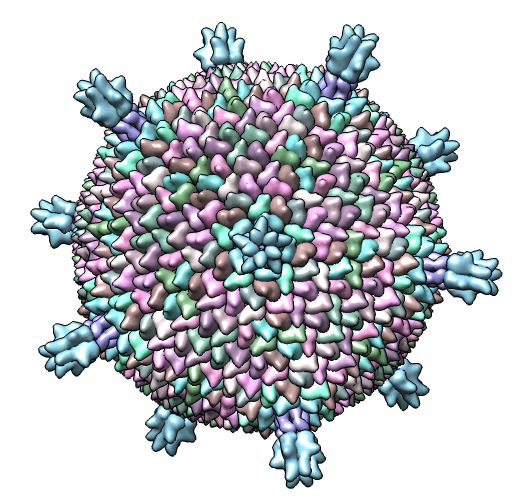
- 4.5 Å structure of Sulfolobus turreted icosahedral virus 1 determined by cryoEM. EMDB entry EMD-1569, PDB entry 3j31.

Virus classification
- (unranked): Virus
- Realm: Varidnaviria
- Kingdom: Abadenavirae
- Phylum: Produgelaviricota
- Class: Belvinaviricetes
- Order: Belfryvirales
- Family: Turriviridae
- Genus: Alphaturrivirus
- Species: Alphaturrivirus yellowstonense

= Sulfolobus turreted icosahedral virus 1 =

Species of virus

Sulfolobus turreted icosahedral virus 1 (formerly Sulfolobus turreted icosahedral virus) is a species of virus that infects the archaeon Sulfolobus solfataricus.

== Virology ==
It is an icosahedrally symmetric virus with a unique triangulation number (T) of 31. The turrets have an average diameter of 24 nm.

The genome is circular double stranded DNA 17,663 base pairs in length with 36 open reading frames. The genome has a G+C content of 36%.

At the end of the infection cycle, virions leave the host cell by inducing host cell lysis and are released through pyramid-like structures that pierce through the S-layer of the cell envelope.
