= STIV =

STIV or Stiv may refer to:

- Sulfolobus turreted icosahedral virus 1 (STIV1) formerly "sulfolobus turreted icosahedral virus" (STIV)
- Star Trek IV: The Voyage Home, fourth film in the original film series
- Untitled sequel to Star Trek Beyond, fourth film in the J.J.Abrams film series, see Star Trek Beyond#Sequel
- Société des Transports Intercommunaux de Verviers, a former Belgian transport company
- Starship Troopers: Invasion, fourth film in the Starship Troopers film series
- Stiv Bators (1949–1990), American punk rock musician

== See also ==
- ST4 (disambiguation)
