= Ace Lake =

Salt water lake in Antarctica

- Location within Antarctica
- Location: Princess Elizabeth Land, East Antarctica
- Coordinates: 68°28′19″S 78°11′16″E
- Max. depth: 9 metres (30 ft)
- Surface elevation: 8.8 metres (29 ft)

The Ace Lake is a 9 metres (30 ft) deep salt water lake on the Ingrid-Christensen coast of the Princess Elisabeth land in East Antarctica. The lake is located on the Langnes peninsula in the Vestfold Hills near the Organic Lake.

Australian biologists at Davis Station explored the lake in 1974 after searching for a saltwater lake with copepods for nine months. The researchers interpreted their discovery as ace, which gave the lake its name. Between 2004 and 2005 a mountain hut was built on the shores of the lake.

In 2013, Zhou et al. discovered a new virophage species by metagenomical analysis, the Ace-Lake-Mavirus (ALM), similar to a short time ago in Organic Lake (OLV) and also in Yellowstone Lake (YSLV). ALM belongs to the virophage genus Mavirus; as a virophage, it is a satellite virus that (as a parasite), when co-infected with a helper virus (host), impairs its ability to replicate. ALV presumably parasitizes species of the Mimiviridae virus family.

== Literature ==
- John Stewart: Antarctica – An Encyclopedia. Bd. 1, McFarland & Co., Jefferson and London 2011, ISBN 978-0-7864-3590-6, p. 4
