= ACMV =

ACMV may refer to:

- Air conditioning and mechanical ventilation; see HVAC
- African cassava mosaic virus, a plant pathogen
- Ateliers de Constructions Mécaniques de Vevey, a Swiss engineering company (rail vehicles)
- Acanthamoeba castellanii mamavirus (ACMV)
