= Vinavirales =

Virus classification
- (unranked): Virus
- Realm: Varidnaviria
- Kingdom: Abedenavirae
- Phylum: Produgelaviricota
- Class: Belvinaviricetes
- Order: Vinavirales

Order of viruses

Vinavirales is an order of viruses.

== Taxonomy ==
The order contains the following families:

- Asemoviridae
- Autolykiviridae
- Corticoviridae
- Mestraviridae
- Parnassusviridae
