= Marseillevirus =

Virus classification
- (unranked): Virus
- Realm: Varidnaviria
- Kingdom: Bamfordvirae
- Phylum: Nucleocytoviricota
- Class: Megaviricetes
- Order: Pimascovirales
- Family: Marseilleviridae
- Genus: Marseillevirus

Genus of viruses

Marseillevirus is a genus of viruses, in the family Marseilleviridae. There are two species in this genus. It is the prototype of a family of nucleocytoplasmic large DNA viruses (NCLDV) of eukaryotes (commonly known as Giant Viruses). It was isolated from amoeba.

== Taxonomy ==
The genus contains the following species:

- Marseillevirus marseillevirus
- Senegalvirus marseillevirus

== History ==
The virus is named after the French city of Marseille.

== Structure ==
Viruses in Marseillevirus have icosahedral geometries. The diameter is around 250 nm. The genome has 457 open reading frames and is circular. The genome has a length of 368 kb, with a G+C content of 44.73%. It encodes a minimum of 49 proteins.

The genome of the virus includes typical NCLDV core genes and genes apparently obtained from eukaryotic hosts and their parasites or symbionts, both bacterial and viral, through probably horizontal gene transfer mechanism.

Genus	Structure	Symmetry	Capsid	Genomic arrangement	Genomic segmentation
Marseillevirus	Icosahedral			Circular	

== Life cycle ==
Viral replication is nucleo-cytoplasmic. DNA-templated transcription is the method of transcription. Amoeba serve as the natural host.

Genus	Host details	Tissue tropism	Entry details	Release details	Replication site	Assembly site	Transmission
Marseillevirus	Amoeba	None	Fusion	Lysis	Cytoplasm	Cytoplasm	Diffusion in Water

== See also ==
Other giant viruses:

- Mimivirus
- Mamavirus
- Emiliania huxleyi virus 86
