= Turriviridae =

Virus classification
- (unranked): Virus
- Realm: Varidnaviria
- Kingdom: Abedenavirae
- Phylum: Produgelaviricota
- Class: Belvinaviricetes
- Order: Belfryvirales
- Family: Turriviridae
- Genus: Alphaturrivirus

Family of viruses

Turriviridae is a family of viruses; it contains only one genus, Alphaturrivirus. The archaea Sulfolobus solfataricus serve as natural hosts. There are two species in the genus Alphaturrivirus.

== Taxonomy ==
The genus contains the following species, listed by scientific name and followed by the exemplar virus of the species:

- Alphaturrivirus hveragerdiense, Sulfolobus turreted icosahedral virus 2
- Alphaturrivirus yellowstonense, Sulfolobus turreted icosahedral virus 1

== Structure ==
Viruses in Turriviridae have icosahedral geometries, and T=31 symmetry. The diameter is around 74 nm. Genomes are circular.

Genus	Structure	Symmetry	Capsid	Genomic arrangement	Genomic segmentation
Alphaturrivirus	Icosahedral	T=31		Linear	

== Life cycle ==
Viral replication is cytoplasmic. Entry into the host cell is achieved by adsorption into the host cell. DNA-templated transcription is the method of transcription. Sulfolobus solfataricus serves as the natural host. Transmission routes are passive diffusion.

Genus	Host details	Tissue tropism	Entry details	Release details	Replication site	Assembly site	Transmission
Alphaturrivirus	Sulfolobus solfataricus	None	Injection	Budding	Cytoplasm	Cytoplasm	Passive Diffusion
