= Lacinutrix copepodicola =

Scientific classification
- Domain: Bacteria
- Kingdom: Pseudomonadati
- Phylum: Bacteroidota
- Class: Flavobacteriia
- Order: Flavobacteriales
- Family: Flavobacteriaceae
- Genus: Lacinutrix
- Species: L. copepodicola

Binomial name
- Lacinutrix copepodicola Bowman and Nichols 2005

Synonyms
- Lacusiradicibacter copepodicola

Species of bacterium

Lacinutrix copepodicola is a species of gram-negative bacterium from the genus of Lacinutrix. The L. copepodicola was first isolated from the lake-dwelling copepod, Paralabidocera antarctica, collected from Ace Lake. The species name of L. copepodicola is derived from the organism from which it was isolated. The species is halophilic and requires media supplemented with sodium ions for growth.
