= Lacinutrix undariae =

Scientific classification
- Domain: Bacteria
- Kingdom: Pseudomonadati
- Phylum: Bacteroidota
- Class: Flavobacteriia
- Order: Flavobacteriales
- Family: Flavobacteriaceae
- Genus: Lacinutrix
- Species: L. undariae

Binomial name
- Lacinutrix undariae Park et al. 2015

Type strain
- W-BA8

Synonyms
- Pseudolacinutrix undariae

Species of bacterium

Lacinutrix undariae is a species of Gram-negative, aerobic and non-motile bacterium from the genus of Lacinutrix. L. undariae is catalase and oxidase positive. Colonies on marine agar are light yellow.
