= Balamuthia infection =

- Specialty: Dermatology

Balamuthia infection is a cutaneous condition resulting from Balamuthia that may result in various skin lesions.

Balamuthia mandrillarisis a free-living amoeba (a single-celled living organism) found in the environment. It is one of the causes of granulomatous amoebic encephalitis (GAE), a serious infection of the brain and spinal cord. Balamuthia is thought to enter the body when soil containing it comes in contact with skin wounds and cuts, or when dust containing it is breathed in or gets in the mouth. The Balamuthia amoebae can then travel to the brain through the bloodstream and cause GAE. GAE is a very rare disease that is usually fatal.

Scientists at the Centers for Disease Control and Prevention (CDC) first discovered Balamuthia mandrillaris in 1986. The amoeba was found in the brain of a dead mandrill. After extensive research, B. mandrillaris was declared a new species in 1993. Since then, more than 200 cases of Balamuthia infection have been diagnosed worldwide, with at least 70 cases reported in the United States. Little is known at this time about how a person becomes infected.

== See also ==
- Acanthamoeba infection
