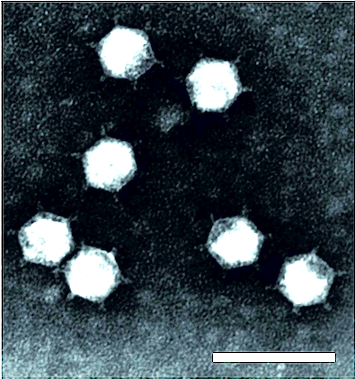

Virus classification
- (unranked): Virus
- Realm: Varidnaviria
- Kingdom: Abadenavirae
- Phylum: Produgelaviricota
- Class: Ainoaviricetes
- Order: Lautamovirales
- Family: Finnlakeviridae

Subtaxa
- Genus: Finnlakevirus; Species: Finnlakevirus FLiP

= Finnlakeviridae =

Family of viruses

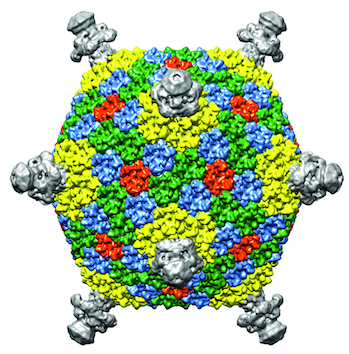
Cryo-electron microscopic reconstruction of the Flavobacterium phage FLiP virion

Finnlakeviridae is a family of bacteriophages that is the sole representative of its own class, Ainoaviricetes (from "ainoa", the Finnish word for "single" + -viricetes). The family contains a single genus, Finnlakevirus, which contains a single species, Finnlakevirus FLiP. This virus was isolated in 2010, with its gram-negative host Flavobacterium, from Lake Jyväsjärvi, a boreal freshwater habitat in Central Finland, and is the first described single-stranded DNA virus with an internal membrane.

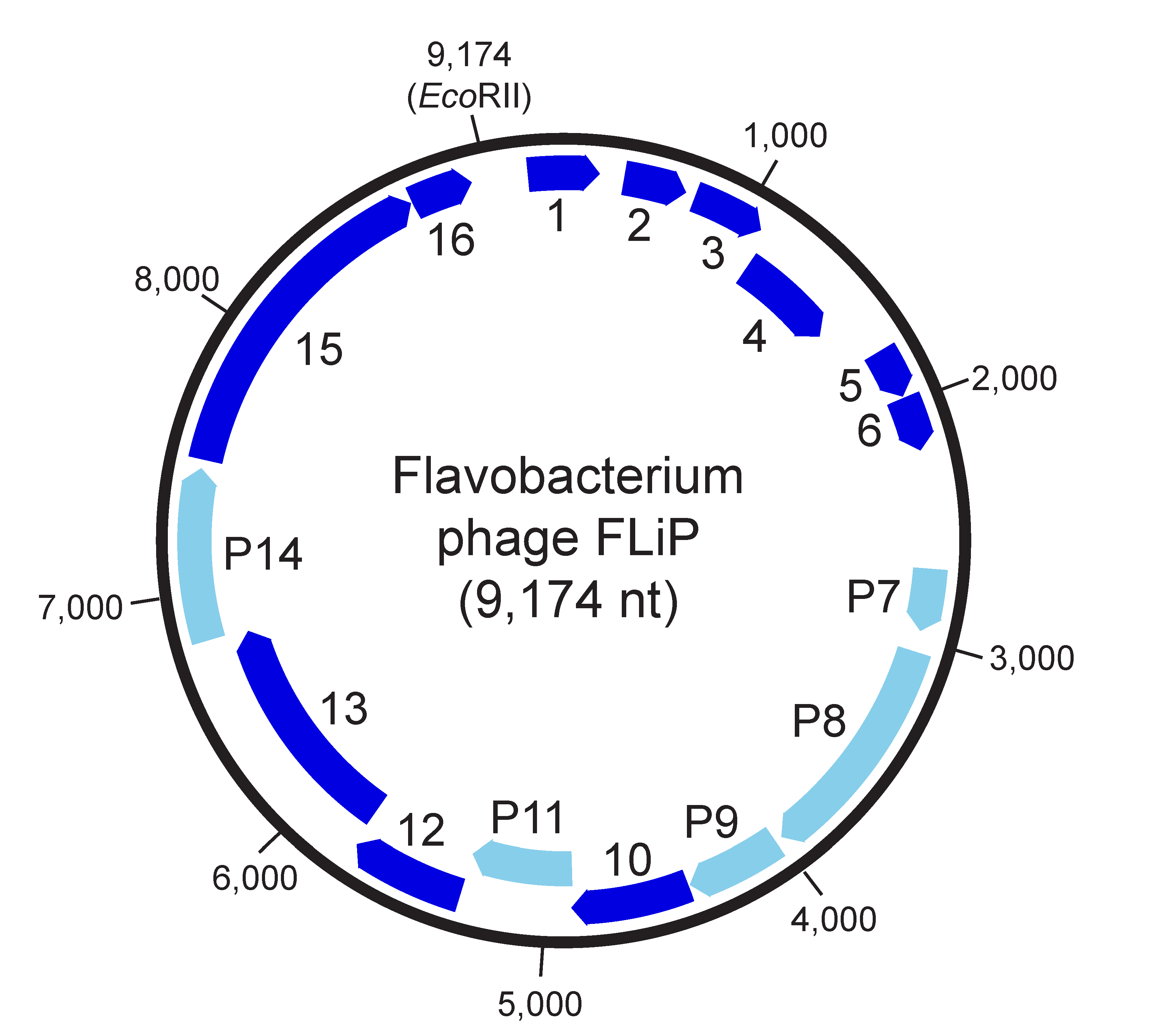
Genome organization of Flavobacterium phage FLiP.

The genome is circular single-stranded DNA of about 9200 nucleotides in length.
