= Lacinutrix gracilariae =

Scientific classification
- Domain: Bacteria
- Kingdom: Pseudomonadati
- Phylum: Bacteroidota
- Class: Flavobacteriia
- Order: Flavobacteriales
- Family: Flavobacteriaceae
- Genus: Lacinutrix
- Species: L. gracilariae

Binomial name
- Lacinutrix gracilariae Huang et al. 2016

Type strain
- Lxc1

Synonyms
- Lacinutrix algaepibiont

Species of bacterium

Lacinutrix gracilariae is a Gram-negative, aerobic and rod-shaped bacterium from the genus of Lacinutrix which has been isolated from the alga Gracilaria sp.
