= Priklausovirales =

Virus classification
- (unranked): Virus
- Realm: Varidnaviria
- Kingdom: Bamfordvirae
- Phylum: Preplasmiviricota
- Class: Virophaviricetes
- Order: Priklausovirales

Order of viruses

Priklausovirales is an order of viruses.

== Taxonomy ==
The order contains four families that are monotypic down to the rank of species, i.e. each family contains only one species:

- Family: Burtonviroviridae
  - Genus: Burquivirus
    - Species: Burquivirus flavolapense
- Family: Dishuiviroviridae
  - Genus: Essdubovirus
    - Species: Essdubovirus chlorellae
- Family: Gulliviroviridae
  - Genus: Invirovirus
    - Species: Invirovirus crochense
- Family: Omnilimnoviroviridae
  - Genus: Panaquavirovirus
    - Species: Panaquavirovirus qinghaense
