= Lacinutrix salivirga =

Scientific classification
- Domain: Bacteria
- Kingdom: Pseudomonadati
- Phylum: Bacteroidota
- Class: Flavobacteriia
- Order: Flavobacteriales
- Family: Flavobacteriaceae
- Genus: Lacinutrix
- Species: L. salivirga

Binomial name
- Lacinutrix salivirga Yoon et al. 2020

Type strain
- KMU-57

Species of bacterium

Lacinutrix salivirga is a Gram-negative, strictly aerobic, rod-shaped and motile bacterium from the genus of Lacinutrix which has been isolated from seawater from Korea. L. salivirga is catalase and oxidase positive. L. salivirga is able to grow at temperatures between 10 and 37 °C, with an optimum growth temperature of 30 °C.
