= Marseilleviridae =

Virus classification
- (unranked): Virus
- Realm: Varidnaviria
- Kingdom: Bamfordvirae
- Phylum: Nucleocytoviricota
- Class: Megaviricetes
- Order: Pimascovirales
- Family: Marseilleviridae

Genera
- Marseillevirus; Losannavirus

Family of viruses

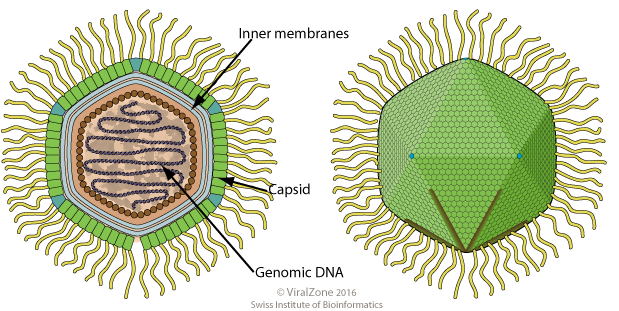
The typical form of the virions of the Marseilleviridae is, in principle, similar to that of the Mimiviridae.

Marseilleviridae is a family of viruses first named in 2012. The genomes of these viruses are double-stranded DNA. Amoeba are often hosts, but there is evidence that they are found in humans as well. The family contains one genus and four species, two of which are unassigned to a genus. It is a member of the nucleocytoplasmic large DNA viruses clade.

== Taxonomy ==
The genus contains the following genera and species:

- Marseillevirus
  - Marseillevirus massiliense
  - Marseillevirus senegalense
- Losannavirus:
  - Losannavirus lausannense
  - Losannavirus tunisense

=== Related Viruses ===
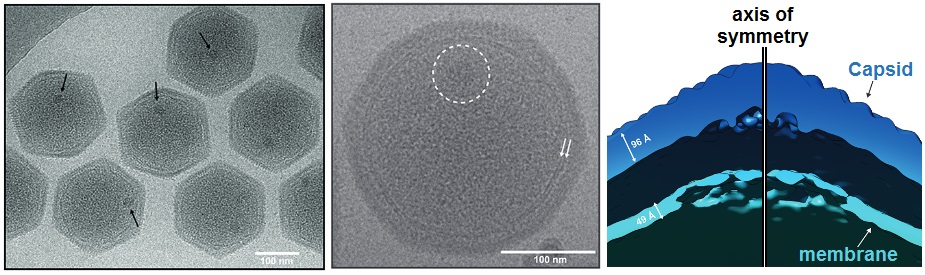
Images of cryo-frozen Marseilleviridae particles (left and center) and enlarged diagram of structure near a vertex. Black arrows indicate Large Dense Bodies. White arrows indicate lipid bilayer.

Additional species have since been recognized. The first member of this family recognized has been named Acanthamoeba polyphaga marseillevirus. A second member is Acanthamoeba castellanii lausannevirus. Two additional viruses have been isolated but have yet to be named. Another member of this family has been isolated from blood donors. An isolate from insects—Insectomime virus—has also been reported.

The viruses appear to fall into at least 3 lineages: (1) Marseillevirus and Cannes8virus (2) Insectomime and Tunisvirus and (3) Lausannevirus. A sixth potential member of this family—Melbournevirus—appears to be related to the Marseillevirus/Cannes8virus clade.

A seventh virus—Brazilian Marseillevirus—has been reported. This virus appears to belong to a fourth lineage of virus in this family.

Another virus—Tokyovirus—has also been reported.

Another member of this family is Kurlavirus.

In 2017, it was proposed that the family contained the following five lineages:

Lineage A

- Cannes 8 virus
- Marseillevirus marseillevirus
- Marseillevirus shanghai
- Melbournvirus
- Senegalvirus
- Tokyovirus

Lineage B

- Kurlavirus
- Lausannevirus
- Noumeavirus
- Port-miou virus

Lineage C

- Insectomime virus
- Tunisvirus

Lineage D

- Brazilian marseillevirus

Lineage E

- Golden marseillevirus

Another putative member of this family is Marseillevirus shanghai. If this virus is confirmed, it would belong to the A lineage.

== Structure ==
Viruses in Marseilleviridae have icosahedral geometries. The diameter is around 250 nm. Genomes are circular, around 372kb in length. The genome has 457 open reading frames.

Genus	Structure	Symmetry	Capsid	Genomic arrangement	Genomic segmentation
Unassigned	Head-Tail	T=16	Non-enveloped	Linear	Monopartite
Marseillevirus	Icosahedral			Circular	

== Life cycle ==
DNA-templated transcription is the method of transcription. Amoeba serve as the natural host.

Genus	Host details	Tissue tropism	Entry details	Release details	Replication site	Assembly site	Transmission
Marseillevirus	Amoeba	None	Fusion	Lysis	Cytoplasm	Cytoplasm	Diffusion in Water

== Genomics ==
A promoter sequence—AAATATTT—has been found associated with 55% of the identified genes in this virus. Most of these sequences occur in multiple copies.

== History ==
One of the first members of this family was described in 2009. Other members described around then (2007) and since then have been documented.
