= Lacinutrix venerupis =

Scientific classification
- Domain: Bacteria
- Kingdom: Pseudomonadati
- Phylum: Bacteroidota
- Class: Flavobacteriia
- Order: Flavobacteriales
- Family: Flavobacteriaceae
- Genus: Lacinutrix
- Species: L. venerupis

Binomial name
- Lacinutrix venerupis Lasa et al. 2016

Type strain
- Cmf 20.8

Species of bacterium

Lacinutrix venerupis is a Gram-negative, strictly aerobic and non-motile bacterium from the genus of Lacinutrix which has been isolated from clams from Galicia in Spain.
