= Lacinutrix cladophorae =

Scientific classification
- Domain: Bacteria
- Kingdom: Pseudomonadati
- Phylum: Bacteroidota
- Class: Flavobacteriia
- Order: Flavobacteriales
- Family: Flavobacteriaceae
- Genus: Lacinutrix
- Species: L. cladophorae

Binomial name
- Lacinutrix cladophorae Nedashkovskaya et al. 2016

Type strain
- 7Alg 4

Species of bacterium

Lacinutrix cladophorae is a species of Gram-negative, strictly aerobic, rod-shaped, and motile bacterium from the genus of Lacinutrix which has been isolated from the alga Cladophora stimpsonii.
