= Lacinutrix iliipiscaria =

Scientific classification
- Domain: Bacteria
- Kingdom: Pseudomonadati
- Phylum: Bacteroidota
- Class: Flavobacteriia
- Order: Flavobacteriales
- Family: Flavobacteriaceae
- Genus: Lacinutrix
- Species: L. iliipiscaria

Binomial name
- Lacinutrix iliipiscaria (Shakeela et al. 2015) Nedashkovskaya et al. 2016

Synonyms
- Flavirhabdus iliipiscaria

Species of bacterium

Lacinutrix iliipiscaria is a Gram-negative and rod-shaped bacterium from the genus of Lacinutrix which has been isolated from the intestine of a flounder (Paralichthys olivaceus). L. iliipiscaria is motile by gliding motility. The species is catalase and oxidase positive, and produces flexirubin-type pigments.
