= ST4 =

ST4 or ST-4 may refer to:

- The Monospar ST-4, a variant of the Monospar aircraft, built by British aircraft manufacturer General Aircraft Limited.
- The Snow Trac ST4, a model in the Snow Trac family of Snowcat vehicles.
- The Ducati ST4s, a motorcycle manufactured by Ducati.
- Star Trek IV: The Voyage Home, a science fiction film in the Star Trek series.
- Starship Troopers: Invasion, fourth entry in the Starship Troopers film series.
- A popular Autoguider port in amateur astronomy

== See also ==
- STIV (disambiguation)
