= Lacinutrix jangbogonensis =

Scientific classification
- Domain: Bacteria
- Kingdom: Pseudomonadati
- Phylum: Bacteroidota
- Class: Flavobacteriia
- Order: Flavobacteriales
- Family: Flavobacteriaceae
- Genus: Lacinutrix
- Species: L. jangbogonensis

Binomial name
- Lacinutrix jangbogonensis Lee et al. 2015

Type strain
- PAMC 27137

Synonyms
- Lacinutrix jangbogoensis

Species of bacterium

Lacinutrix jangbogonensis is a Gram-negative, strictly aerobic, rod-shaped, psychrophilic and non-motile bacterium from the genus of Lacinutrix which has been isolated from marine sediments from the Ross Sea. L. jangbogodensis prefers colder temperatures (4-10 °C), with an optimum growth temperature of 10 °C. On marine agar, colonies are yellow and shiny.
