= Lacinutrix chionocetis =

Scientific classification
- Domain: Bacteria
- Kingdom: Pseudomonadati
- Phylum: Bacteroidota
- Class: Flavobacteriia
- Order: Flavobacteriales
- Family: Flavobacteriaceae
- Genus: Lacinutrix
- Species: L. chionocetis

Binomial name
- Lacinutrix chionocetis Kim et al. 2021

Type strain
- MAB-07

Species of bacterium

Lacinutrix chionocetis is a species of Gram-negative, aerobic, rod-shaped and non-motile bacterium from the genus of Lacinutrix which has been isolated from the gut of a red snow crab.
