= Lacinutrix =

Scientific classification
- Domain: Bacteria
- Kingdom: Pseudomonadati
- Phylum: Bacteroidota
- Class: Flavobacteriia
- Order: Flavobacteriales
- Family: Flavobacteriaceae
- Genus: Lacinutrix; Bowman and Nichols 2005

Type species
- Lacinutrix copepodicola

Species
- L. algicola L. chionocetis L. chionoecetis L. cladophorae L. copepodicola L. gracilariae L. himadriensis L. iliipiscaria L. jangbogonensis L. mariniflava L. salivirga L. undariae L. venerupis

Genus of bacteria

Lacinutrix is a genus of Gram-negative and strictly aerobic bacteria from the family of Flavobacteriaceae.
