= Lacinutrix algicola =

Scientific classification
- Domain: Bacteria
- Kingdom: Pseudomonadati
- Phylum: Bacteroidota
- Class: Flavobacteriia
- Order: Flavobacteriales
- Family: Flavobacteriaceae
- Genus: Lacinutrix
- Species: L. algicola

Binomial name
- Lacinutrix algicola Nedashkovskaya et al. 2008

Type strain
- AKS432

Species of bacterium

Lacinutrix algicola is a species of Gram-negative, aerobic and heterotrophic bacterium from the genus of Lacinutrix which has been isolated from a red alga.
