= Acanthamoeba infection =

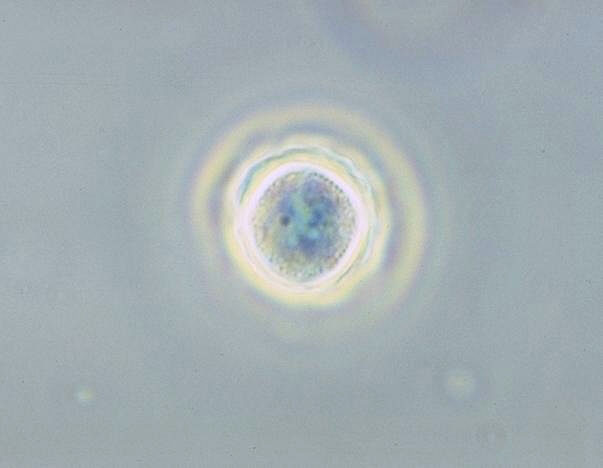
- Acanthamoeba polyphaga cyst. Phase contrast. Ameba, parasite.
- Specialty: Dermatology

Acanthamoeba infection is a cutaneous condition resulting from Acanthamoeba that may result in various skin lesions. Acanthamoeba strains can also infect human eyes causing Acanthamoeba keratitis.

== See also ==
- Balamuthia infection
