= Acanthamoeba pyriformis =

Scientific classification
- Domain: Eukaryota
- Clade: Amorphea
- Phylum: Amoebozoa
- Class: Discosea
- Order: Centramoebida
- Family: Acanthamoebidae
- Genus: Acanthamoeba
- Species: A. pyriformis

Binomial name
- Acanthamoeba pyriformis (Olive & Stoianovitch, 1969)

Synonyms
- Protostelium pyriformis Olive & Stoianovitch, 1969

Species of amoebozoa

Acanthamoeba pyriformis is a species of the genus Acanthamoeba with a unique fruiting system with a sporocarp stage and pyriform spores. It is primarily found in leaf litter in multiple different climates.

== Taxonomy ==
Acanthamoeba pyriformis is classified in the genus Acanthamoeba. A. pyriformis was originally placed in genus Protostelium when it was described by Olive and Stoianovitch in 1969 based on morphology. The species showed similarities such as fruiting body development and morphology and more to other Protostelia so the researchers classified it as such, naming the species pyriformis due to its pyriform, pear-shaped, spores. Using a combination of morphology, behavior, and DNA sequencing, it was reclassified into Acanthamoeba.

== Ecology ==
Acanthamoeba species are generally described as opportunistic, meaning that it can survive in many different environments such as sea water, natural water, tap water, soil, and even humans. However, A. pyriformis is found primarily in leaf litter and can also be found on other types of decaying organic matter. In one study, this organism was found in Costa Rica, but it is found in other parts of the world as well.

== Morphology and behavior ==
The organism Acanthamoeba pyriformis was originally deemed Protostelium due to its ability to build sporocarps. However, with new developments in DNA sequencing and comparison, scientists began to question this organism's original classification. It was then reclassified into the Acanthamoeba genus, which made it the first species of Acanthamoeba to include facultative sporocarpic fruiting in its life cycle.

During the locomotion stage of their life, the amoebae are flat and can vary in shape. They are typically longer than their width, with an average cell length of 26.9 micrometers. The amoeba is led by a lobose, hyaloplasmic pseudopodium that usually contains acanthopodia, a specialized form of pseudopodia. The cell's granular cytoplasm contains a single, spherical or sub-spherical nucleus. When forming cysts, the cysts are isodiametric with stellate knobs, having an average diameter of 13.1 micrometers. Sporocarps develop as the amoeba becomes refractile. A stalk is formed and deposited in the lower portion of the sporogen.

At maturity, the sporogen lays down a spore wall and becomes an obpyriform spore, following which air can shed and disperse the spore. The genus Acanthamoeba typically has a life cycle that has a trophozoite stage, the feeding stage where the amoeba is most active, and a cyst stage, a dormant stage that allows the organism to survive unfavorable conditions. A. pyriformis is unique because it also includes the sporocarp stage, a structure that contains spores. Being a facultative stage, it doesn't occur in all individuals.
