= Lacinutrix himadriensis =

Scientific classification
- Domain: Bacteria
- Kingdom: Pseudomonadati
- Phylum: Bacteroidota
- Class: Flavobacteriia
- Order: Flavobacteriales
- Family: Flavobacteriaceae
- Genus: Lacinutrix
- Species: L. himadriensis

Binomial name
- Lacinutrix himadriensis Srinivas et al. 2013

Type strain
- E4-9a

Species of bacterium

Lacinutrix himadriensis is a Gram-negative, rod-shaped, psychrophilic and non-motile bacterium from the genus of Lacinutrix.
