= Mamavirus =

Virus classification
- (unranked): Virus
- Realm: Varidnaviria
- Kingdom: Bamfordvirae
- Phylum: Nucleocytoviricota
- Class: Megaviricetes
- Order: Imitervirales
- Family: Mimiviridae
- Genus: Mimivirus
- Species: Mamavirus

Genus of viruses

Mamavirus is a large and complex virus in the Group I family Mimiviridae. The virus is exceptionally large, and larger than many bacteria. Mamavirus and other mimiviridae belong to nucleocytoplasmic large DNA virus (NCLDVs) family. Mamavirus can be compared to the similar complex virus mimivirus; mamavirus was so named because it is similar to but larger than mimivirus.

== Discovery ==
Mamavirus was first reported in September 2008. Like mimivirus, mamavirus was isolated from an amoeba in a cooling tower. The mimiviridae were not discovered until recently because of their large size, as when filtered the mimiviridae stay with the similarly-sized bacteria. This led scientists to believe they were also bacteria. Mimivirus was first isolated in 1992 when scientists were looking for the cause of a pneumonia outbreak in Bradford, UK. Due to its size it was named Bradfordcoccus and put in a freezer with scientists thinking it was a bacterium. A decade later, Jean-Michel Claverie and Didier Raoult discovered “Bradfordcoccus” was no bacterium when they tried to digest the cell wall with no success. Deciding to take a different route they looked at it under an electron microscope. They were surprised to find that it looked like a giant iridovirus, which are icosahedral viruses that infect insects, fish, and frogs. Knowing this paved the way for the discovery of mamavirus because scientists knew to look for other giant viruses.

It was originally isolated from Acanthamoeba polyphaga, but subsequent work has involved Acanthamoeba castellanii (Acanthamoeba castellanii mamavirus, ACMV).

== Structure and genome ==
Mamavirus, like other mimiviridae, is icosahedral with a core capsid and a peripheral fiber layer. It contains a linear double-stranded DNA genome which has a very high coding density that is characteristic of NCLDVs. The mimiviridae contain very similar genomes due to gene duplications, and a fair piece of the genome is associated with functions not previously found in a virus.

== Replication ==
Mamavirus possesses its own transcription machinery, and it packages transcription proteins in its particles. Transcription is believed to occur in the core particles. The core releases viral DNA and forms a cytoplasmic replication factory where DNA replication begins and transcription of late genes occurs. The replication factory forms around the viral core and expands until it occupies a large fraction of the amoeba cell volume. Later stages of the replication cycle involve partially assembled procapsids undergoing DNA packaging.

== Sputnik virophage ==
While the mimiviridae were a surprise themselves, mamavirus contained an even bigger surprise. While looking at mamavirus under the electron microscope, Raoult discovered a second, small virus closely associated with mamavirus which was named Sputnik virophage, a satellite virus. Sputnik contains 21 genes and is tiny compared to mamavirus; however, it is quite powerful in its effects on mamavirus. Sputnik cannot replicate in acanthamoeba cells without a simultaneous infection by mamavirus (or mimivirus) so it infects the viral factory that mamavirus creates and hijacks it to replicate its own genome. This causes mamavirus to produce fewer viruses that are often deformed and less effective; there is also evidence of a partial thickening of the capsid. The fact that Sputnik can do this suggests that it is a viral parasite, and thus, was named the first virophage. A virophage is similar to bacteriophage viruses, which infect and sicken bacteria, but virophages infect viruses. Sputnik contains a circular double-stranded DNA of 18,343 base pairs, and is icosahedral in shape. Of the 21 genes it contains, eight encode proteins that have homologues. Of these eight, three are thought to be derived from mamavirus or mimivirus. This indicates that Sputnik can participate in gene-transfer processes and mediate lateral gene transfer between giant viruses.

== Implications ==
Mamavirus has caused scientists to review the criteria of life; to start questioning whether viruses are alive, revive the debate about the origin of DNA viruses and their possible role in the emergence of the eukaryotic nucleus.

== See also ==
- Mimivirus
- Sputnik virophage
- Marseillevirus
