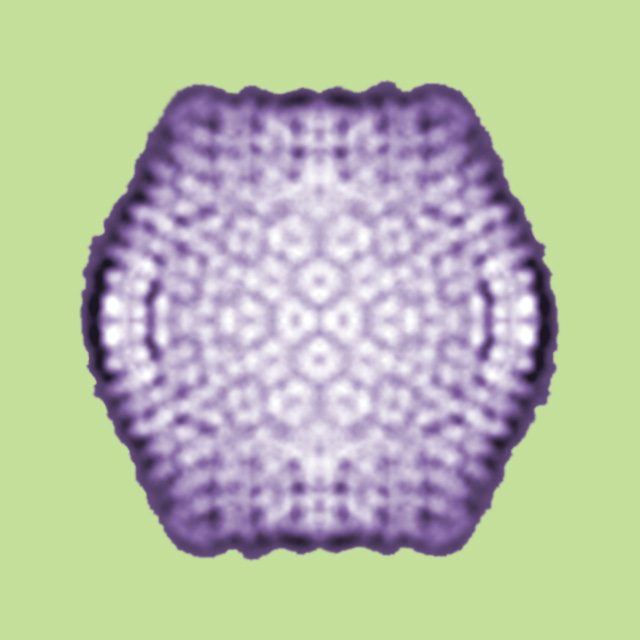
- Sputnik virophage

Virus classification
- (unranked): Virus
- Realm: Varidnaviria
- Kingdom: Bamfordvirae
- Phylum: Preplasmiviricota
- Subphylum: Polisuviricotina
- Class: Virophaviricetes

Subtaxa
- See text

= Virophage =

Virophaviricetes

Viral parasites of giant viruses

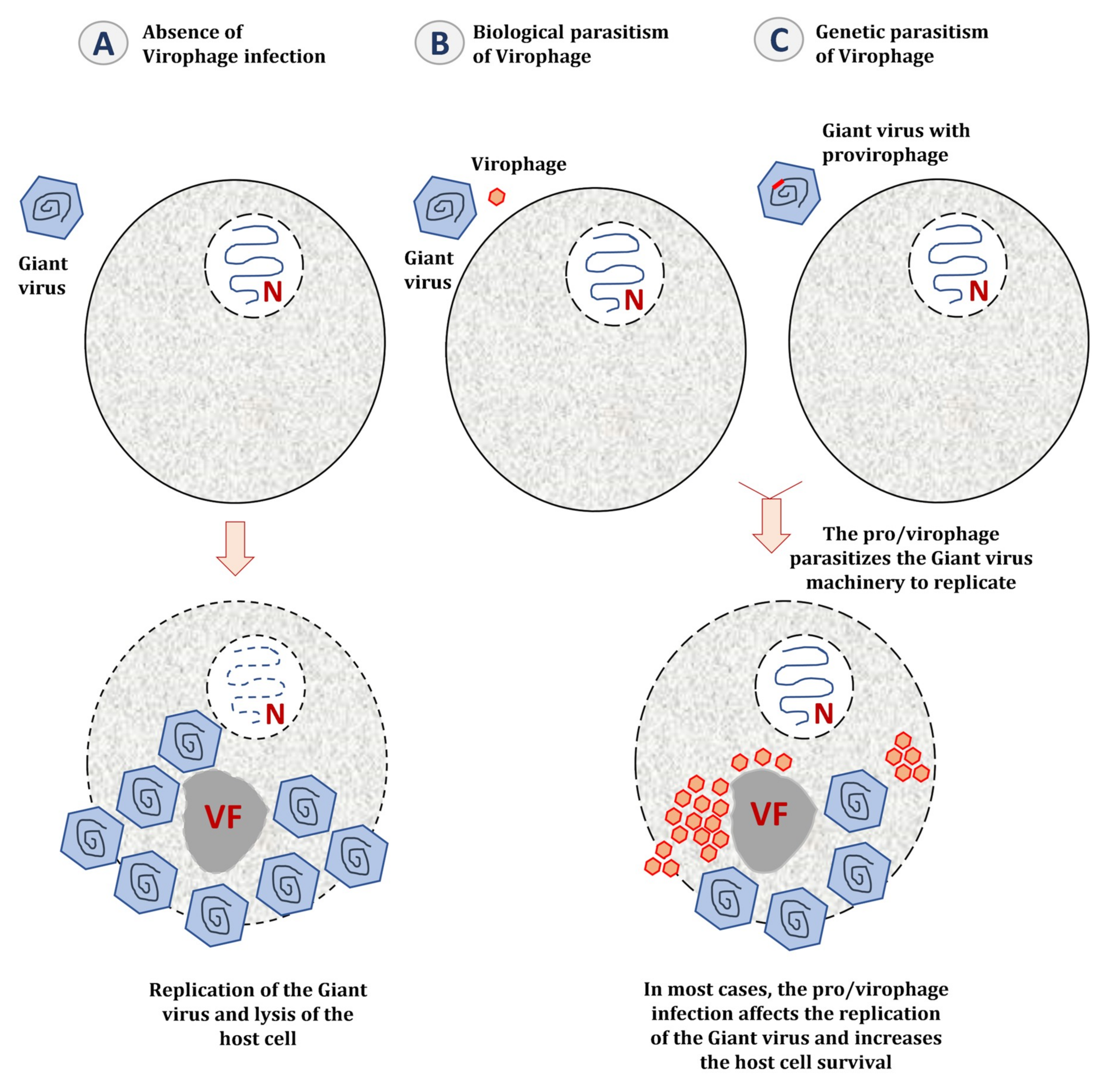
The parasitic lifestyle of virophages (A) When the host cell is only infected by a giant virus, the latter establishes a cytoplasmic virus factory to replicate and generates new virions, and the host cell is most likely lysed at the end of its replication cycle. (B) When the host cell is co-infected with a giant virus and its virophage, the latter parasitizes the giant virus's virus factory. The presence of virophages could seriously impact the infectivity of the giant virus by decreasing its replication efficiency and increasing the survival of the host cell. (C) When the giant virus genome is parasitized by a provirophage, the latter is expressed during the giant virus replication. The virophage is produced from the giant virus factory and inhibits the giant virus replication, thus increasing the host cell survival. VF: Virus factory

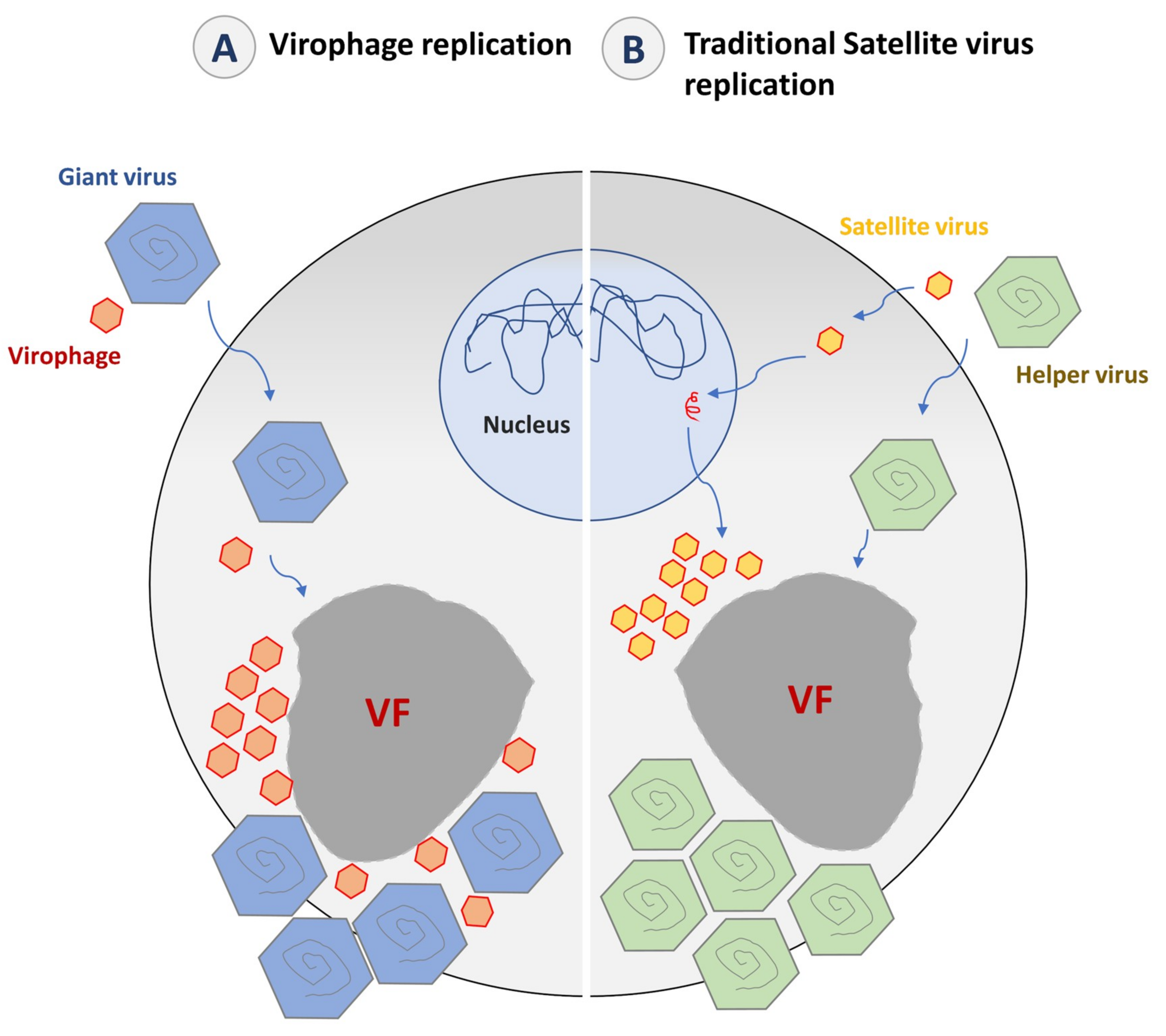
Virophages and satellite virus' lifestyle (A) The replication of virophages is supposed to occur entirely in the virus factory of its giant virus host, depending on the giant virus expression/replication complex. (B) Satellite viruses initiate the expression and replication of their genomes in the nucleus using the host cell's machinery and then go to the cytoplasm. In the cytoplasm, the satellite virus hijacks the morphogenesis machinery of its helper virus to produce its progeny.

Virophages are small, double-stranded DNA viruses that require the co-infection of another virus. The co-infecting viruses are typically giant viruses. Virophages rely on the viral replication factory of the co-infecting giant virus for their own replication. One of the characteristics of virophages is that they have a parasitic relationship with the co-infecting virus. Their dependence upon the giant virus for replication sometimes results in reduced virulence of the giant viruses. Many virophage genomes are endogenized into the genomes of single-celled eukaryotes, and they reactivate upon infection of a giant virus, thereby providing a form of inducible antiviral defense. The virophage may improve the recovery and survival of the host organism. Most known virophages are classified within the class Virophaviricetes and are associated with giant viruses of the family Mimiviridae. Virophages are associated with a range of other host viruses, however, including insect poxviruses.

== Discovery ==
The first virophage was discovered in a cooling tower in Paris in 2008. It was discovered with its co-infecting giant virus, Acanthamoeba castellanii mamavirus (ACMV). The virophage was named Sputnik and its replication relied entirely on the co-infection of ACMV and its cytoplasmic replication machinery. Sputnik was also discovered to have an inhibitory effect on ACMV and improved the survival of the host. Other characterised virophages include Sputnik 2, Sputnik 3, Zamilon and Mavirus.

A majority of these virophages are being discovered by analyzing metagenomic data sets. In metagenomic analysis, DNA sequences are run through multiple bioinformatic algorithms which pull out certain important patterns and characteristics. In these data sets are giant viruses and virophages. They are separated by looking for sequences around 17 to 20 kbp long which have similarities to already sequenced virophages. These virophages can have linear or circular double-stranded DNA genomes. Known virophages in culture have icosahedral capsid particles that measure around 40 to 80 nanometers long, and virophage particles are so small that electron microscopy must be used to view them. Metagenomic sequence-based analyses have been used to predict around 57 complete and partial virophage genomes and in December 2019 to identify 328 high-quality (complete or near-complete) genomes from diverse habitats including the human gut, plant rhizosphere, and terrestrial subsurface, from 27 distinct taxonomic clades.

== Host range and replication ==
Virophages need to have a co-infecting virus in order for them to replicate. The virophages do not have the necessary enzymes to replicate on their own. Virophages use the giant viral replication machinery to replicate their own genomes and continue their existence. The host range for virophages include giant viruses with double stranded DNA genomes. Virophages use the transcriptional machinery of these giant viruses for their own replication instead of the host's transcriptional machinery. For example, the discovery of the virophage associated with the Samba virus decreased the viruses concentration in the host while the virophage was replicating using the giant virus. The host amoeba also showed a partial recovery from the infection by the Samba virus.

== Genome ==
Virophages have small double-stranded DNA genomes that are either circular or linear in shape. The size of these genomes can vary depending on the giant virus it infects. Most virophages have genomes around 17–30 kbp (kilobasepairs). Their genome is protected by an icosahedral capsid measuring approximately 40–80 nm in length. In contrast, their co-infecting giant virus counterparts can have genomes as large as 1–2 Mbp (megabasepairs). Some of the largest genomes of virophages are similar to the genome size of an adenovirus.

	Genome Size (kbp)	Particle Size (diameter, in nm)
Virus: Poliovirus	7	30
Virus: Adenoviridae	26–48	90–100
Virophage: Zamilon Virophage	17	50–60
Virophage: Sputnik Virophage	18	74
Giant virus: Cafeteria roenbergensis virus	700	75
Giant virus: Mimivirus	1,181	400–800

All virophages known so far have four core genes. They are the virophage-specific major and minor capsid proteins (MCP and mCP), PRO (cysteine protease), and a DNA-packaging ATPase. The two capsids are almost universally found in a conserved block. The MCP has two vertical jelly roll fold domain typical of Bamfordvirae, while the mCP (penton) has a regular jelly roll fold domain.

== Taxonomy ==
Virophages constitute the class Virophaviricetes. The name of the class is composed of Viropha-, derived from "virophage", and -viricetes, the suffix used for virus classes. The class was called Maveriviricetes from 2019 to 2024 and was renamed in 2025. Virophaviricetes has four orders, three of which are monotypic down to lower taxa. This taxonomy is shown hereafter.

- Class: Virophaviricetes
  - Order: Divpevirales
    - Family: Ruviroviridae
      - Genus: Oviruvirus
  - Order: Lavidavirales
    - Family: Maviroviridae
      - Genus: Mavirus
  - Order: Mividavirales
    - Family: Sputniviroviridae
      - Genus: Sputnikvirus
  - Order: Priklausovirales

Additionally, virophage genomes identified from metagenomes have been classified together with the isolate virophages into 27 distinct clades with consistent genome length, gene content, and habitat distribution. Some fragmentary virophage sequences were additionally reported in a Loki's Castle metagenome.

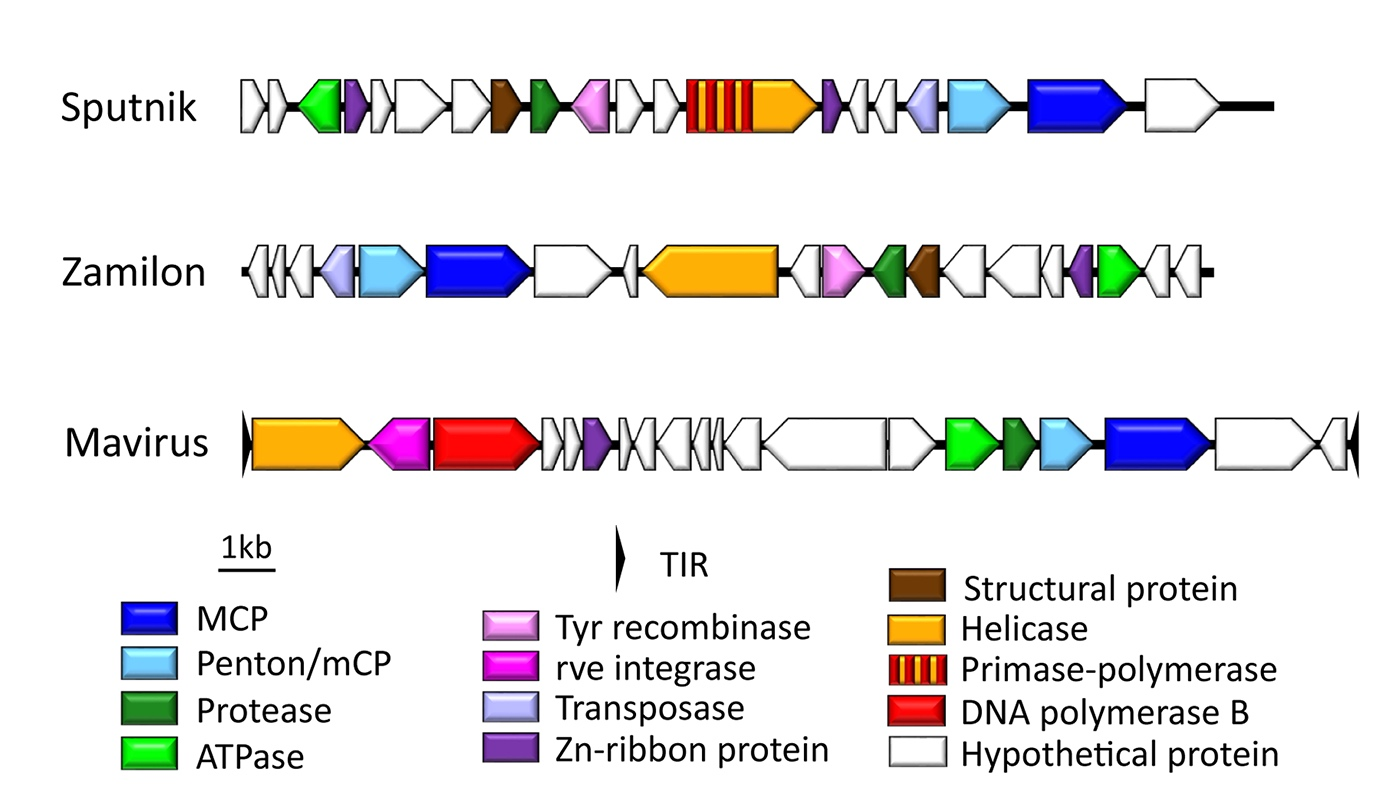
Genome organization of cultured virophages Genome representation of the virophages Sputnik, Zamilon, and Mavirus. Homologous genes are colored identically.

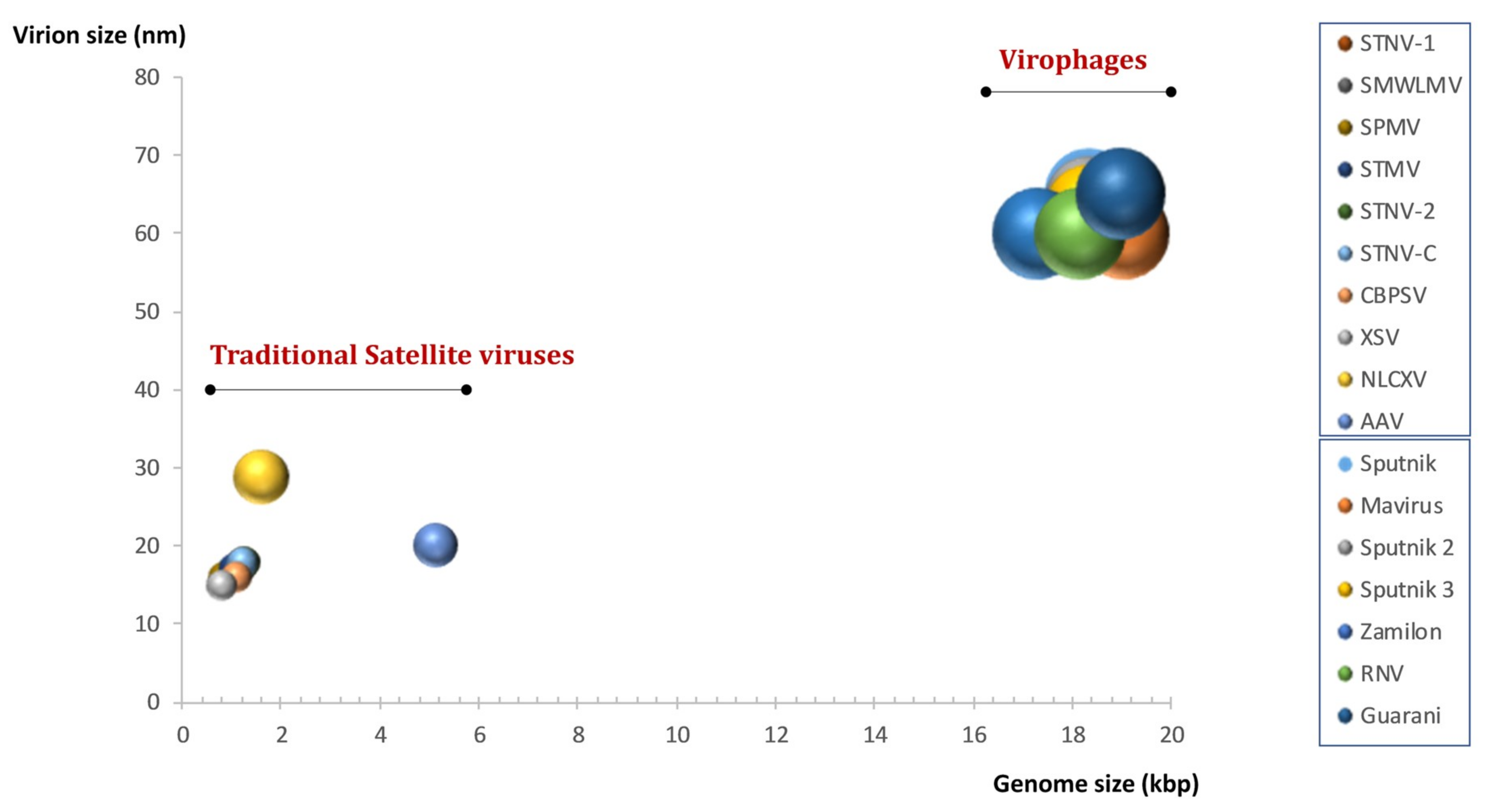
The parasites of the giants are giants Plot comparing the virion and genome sizes for known virophages and some traditional satellite viruses. The ball sizes are proportional to the capsid sizes.

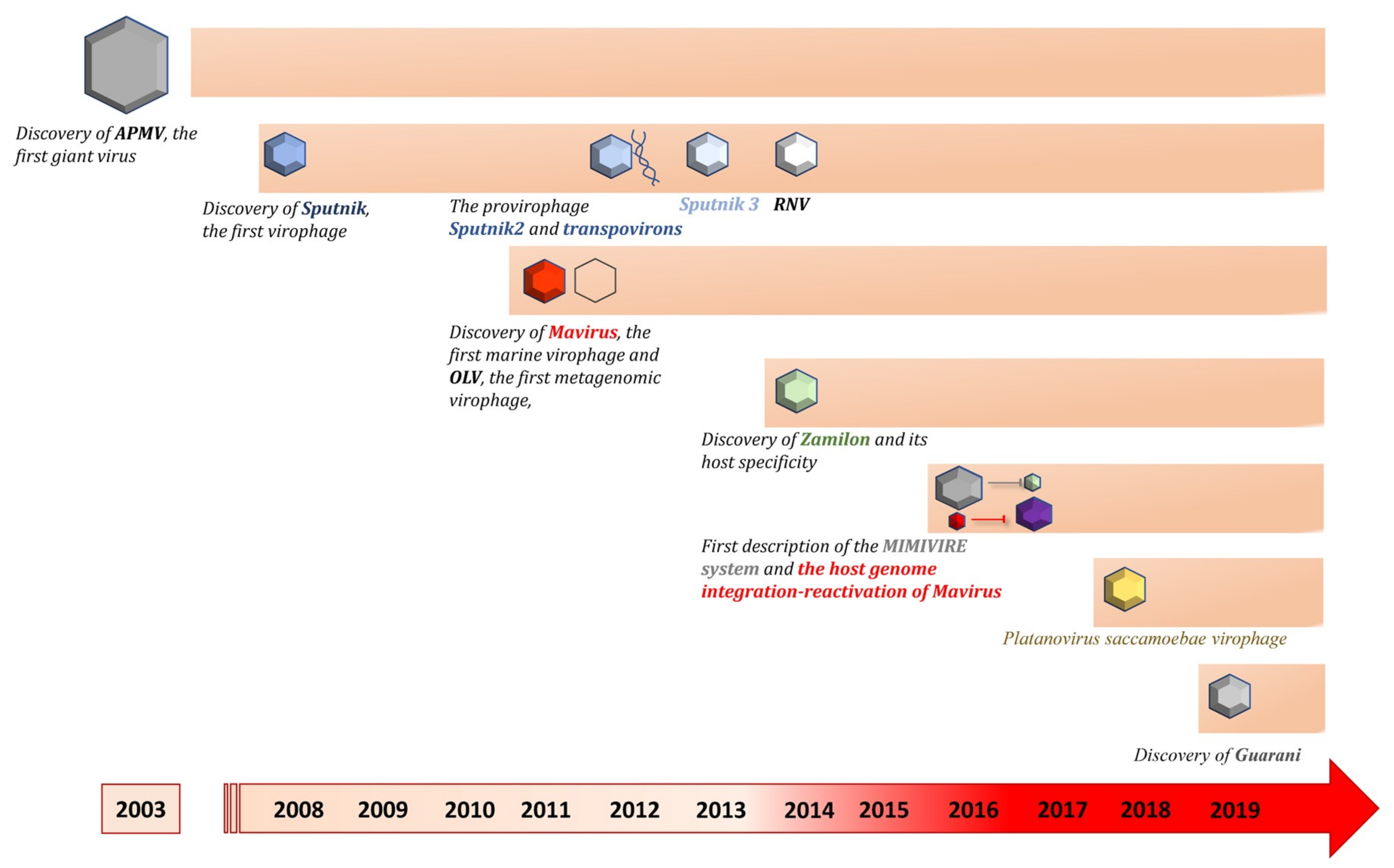
Timeline of virophage discoveries 2003–2019 Timeline showing the chronological order of description of virophages isolated by co-culture and the major discoveries in the virophage field. RNV: Rio Negro Virophage. OLV: Organic Lake Virophage.

== See also ==
- Organic Lake virophage
