= Organic Lake virophage =

Virus classification
- (unranked): Virus
- Realm: Varidnaviria
- Kingdom: Bamfordvirae
- Phylum: Preplasmiviricota
- Class: Virophaviricetes
- Order: Lavidavirales
- Genus: incertae sedis
- (unranked): Organic Lake virophage

Organic Lake virophage (OLV) is a double-stranded DNA virophage (a virus that requires the presence of another virus to replicate itself and in so doing limits the ability of the other virus to replicate). It was detected metagenomically in samples from Organic Lake, Antarctica.

== Virology ==
The virophage appears to be ~100 nanometers in diameter and to be enveloped. It preys on Organic Lake phycodnaviruses, which in fact may rather belong to Mimiviridae than to Phycodnaviridae.

The genome is double-stranded DNA and is 26,421 base pairs in length.

Proteins encoded by it include the major capsid protein, a DNA packaging ATPase, a putative DNA polymerase/primase and a N6 adenine specific DNA methyltransferase.
