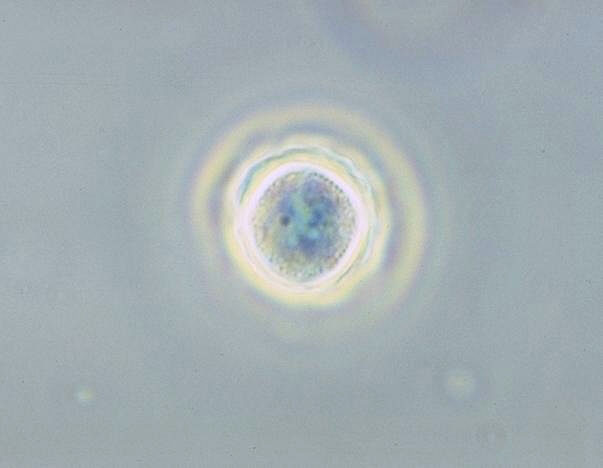
- Image of Acanthamoeba polyphaga cyst, using phase-contrast microscope (1973)

Scientific classification
- Domain: Eukaryota
- Supergroup: Amorphea
- Phylum: Amoebozoa
- Class: Discosea
- Order: Centramoebida
- Family: Acanthamoebidae
- Genus: Acanthamoeba
- Species: A. polyphaga

Binomial name
- Acanthamoeba polyphaga (Puschkarew, 1913)

= Acanthamoeba polyphaga =

Species of amoeba

Acanthamoeba polyphaga is a species of protozoa that exists as a free-living amoeba in the environment and is a facultative parasite of humans. The name is derived from the Greek word acantha (meaning spike or thorn), and amoeba (meaning change) to describe the organism's morphological spine-like structure (known as an acanthopodia). A. polyphaga has two stages in its life cycle: a trophozoite (active) stage and a cyst (dormant) stage.

== Distribution and typical habitat ==
Species in the genus Acanthamoeba are considered highly prevalent protozoa found within the environment. Most often, A. polyphaga can be found in soil, fresh water, and chlorinated pools. However, due to its nature as an opportunistic protozoan, it can also be found in contact lens solution, seawater, tap water, bottled water, and dust, air, sewage, HVAC systems, dialysis machines, dental treatment units, and hospitals. Human infections with Acanthamoeba polyphaga are reported worldwide, and although a less common infection, it does pose a severe threat to eyesight.

== Methods of infection ==
Acanthamoeba polyphaga can enter the eye in a few different ways, including through contact lenses, contaminated water, and eye injuries. Once it enters the eye of the human host by one of these methods, then the steps are as follows: 1) the trophozoite binds to the cornea causing the shedding of skin cells (i.e. desquamation), 2) it reaches the basement membrane, 3) it then uses enzymes known as proteases to break down the proteins, and 3) they move into the Bowman's membrane, the area just below the epithelium of the cornea. Throughout this process, the amoeba engulfs the host cells via phagocytosis, which in late stage cases can lead to permanent blindness.

Acanthamoeba polyphaga can infect humans and cause Amoebic Keratitis, an infection within the eye that in severe cases can lead to pain, sensitivity to light, corneal ulcers, blurred vision and/or loss of vision in infected eye. Although infection with A. polyphaga is typically seen in the eye, it can also be found in the brain (causing Granulomatous Amoebic Encephalitis) and other organs such as the skin and respiratory system. Many cases of Amoebic Keratitis tend to be associated with contact lens use, when wearers do not effectively wash their hands and disinfect their contacts before putting them in. General multipurpose contact solutions do not kill the Acanathamoeba cysts, only those that have a hydrogen peroxide base.

== Diagnosis ==
The diagnostic life cycle stage of A. polyphaga can be both the trophozoite and the cyst stage, but the infective stage is the trophozoite stage. Acanthamoeba polyphaga is typically diagnosed by taking a sample of fluid from the patient such as eye fluid or cerebrospinal fluid (obtained through a lumbar puncture procedure), then performing microscope examination tests and/or specialized laboratory cultures. Some examples of these methods are Immunohistochemistry, PCR, and DNA sequence variance analysis.

== Treatment ==
Methods of treatment vary depending on the site of infection, for eye infections an anti-parasitic medication such as Chlorhexidine or Propamidine isethionate are prescribed whereas for brain infections, anti-fungal medications such as Amphotericin B are prescribed in order to treat the infection.

== Prevention ==
Avoid swimming and diving in contaminated waters, regularly disinfect contact lenses with hydrogen-peroxide based lens solution, and using caution when working in and with soil.
