= Hydrogen peroxide contact solution =

Cleaning solution for contact lenses

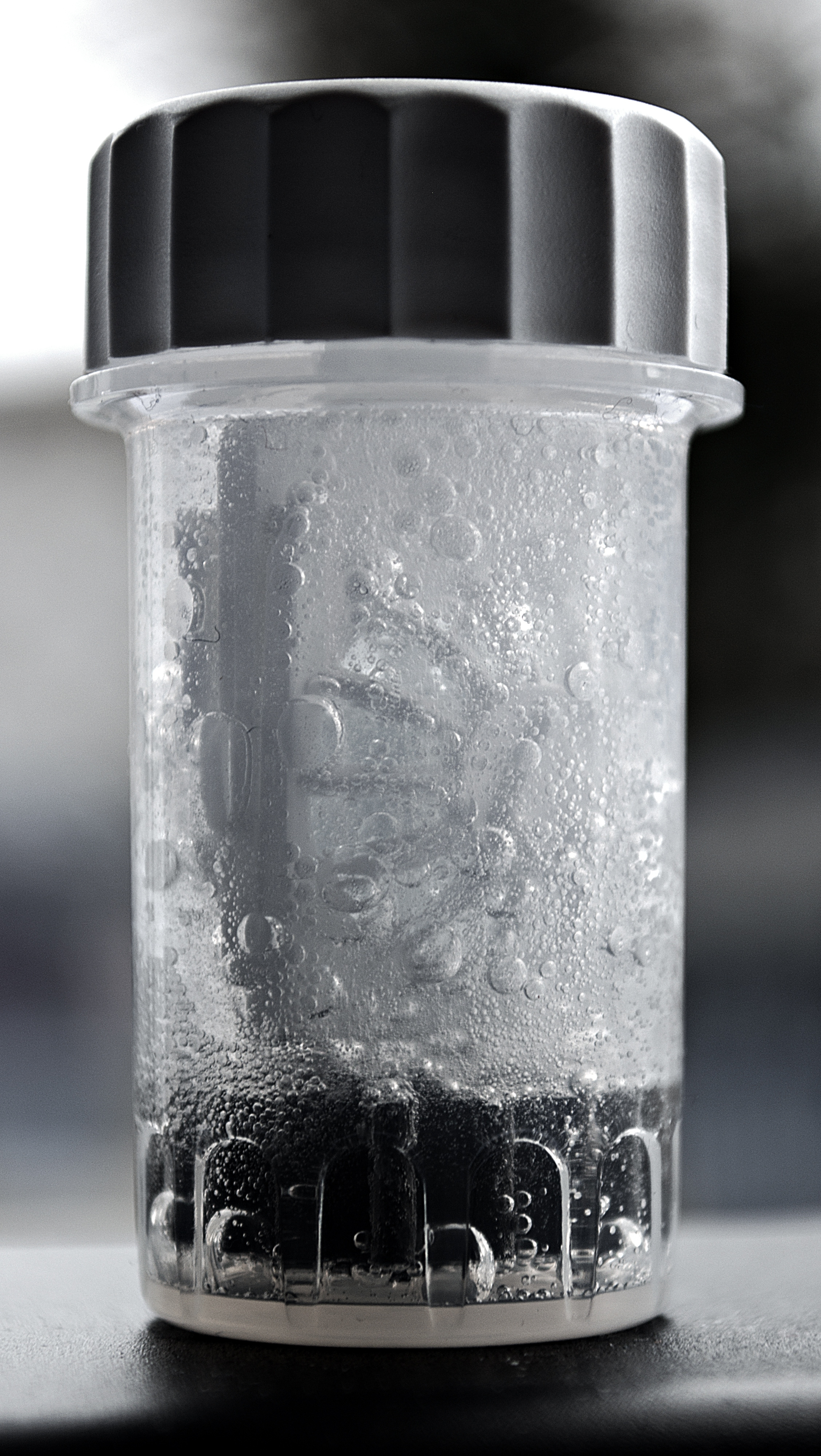
Lenses soaking in a hydrogen peroxide-based solution. The case is part of a one-step system and includes a catalytic disc to neutralise the peroxide over time.

Hydrogen peroxide contact solutions are storage solutions for contact lenses that rely on hydrogen peroxide to clean the contacts and break up proteins and deposits during the disinfection process.

== Mechanism of action ==
The majority of hydrogen peroxide solutions are 3% hydrogen peroxide. This enables the solution to break down any proteins that coat the contacts after a long period of use. Hydrogen peroxide is always used alongside a neutralizing product. The intention is to prevent the hydrogen peroxide from contact with the eye, which could damage the corneal cells in the epithelium. While this would not result in permanent damage, it can cause an intense burn that can linger even after an eye rinse. Burned cells heal very quickly once the natural tear film is restored.

In order to prevent eye damage, the solution must undergo a chemical reaction before the contacts are placed into the individual's eyes. The contacts are placed into a special container with a platinum-coated disk, which reacts with the hydrogen peroxide. This “redox” reaction (reduction and oxidation) produces small bubbles that help to clean the contacts. After 6-8 hours, the hydrogen peroxide becomes an eye-safe saline solution. At this point, it is safe to use the contact lenses. After extended use, the platinum coated disk must be replaced.

== Hydrogen peroxide versus multipurpose solutions ==
Both hydrogen peroxide and multipurpose solutions remove debris and build-up. Significant differences exist between the two. Hydrogen peroxide has the ability to penetrate microbial films, which helps create a deeper clean. Hydrogen peroxide solutions do not contain preservatives. This can be beneficial for people who are allergic or sensitive to the preservatives in multipurpose solutions. Hydrogen peroxide solutions have a greater ability to fight acanthamoeba keratitis, a rare infection that can cause blindness. Some researchers have found the peroxide cleaning regimen to encourage better contact lens care practices among peroxide users compared to multipurpose solution users.

Multipurpose solutions tend to be less expensive. Contacts do not have to be placed in multipurpose solutions for extended intervals, whereas contacts must be left in a hydrogen peroxide solution for hours. The main attraction of multipurpose solutions is that the same solution can clean, rinse, disinfect and store lenses. Hydrogen peroxide solutions require a separate solution in order to rinse the contacts. Procedural mistakes put eyes at risk from contacting the hydrogen peroxide.

== Types ==
Three main name brands are available along with several generic products. The original brands were Softmate, Mirasept, Lensept, Oxysept I/II, IN a wink, and AOSept. Clear Care, the current evolution of the old AOsept system, is said to count for more than 80 percent of the hydrogen peroxide systems sold in the US. Clear Care contains a poloxamine derivative surfactant that helps loosen debris and deposits via a bubbling action and has a platinum disk that neutralizes the solution and is good for up to 100 uses. Prior to Clear Care, the market only provided a two step system where you first soaked the lenses in peroxide for a short period of time or overnight then replaced it with a neutralizing saline. These systems used a catalyse enzyme in saline form and was preserved. The AOSept system made by American Optical was the peroxide solution uses a disk to neutralize the solution. The Lensept system was also similar and used two different cups, one contained the disc and the other was for soaking. Oxysept and Omnicare was slightly different from the other two brands in that it uses tablets for the neutralization effect, which causes a slower process. The result of the tablets is a longer exposure to more concentrated hydrogen peroxide. Following recommendations to add an enzymatic cleaner weekly, increases costs.
