= Organic Lake =

- Location within Antarctica
- Location: Antarctica
- Coordinates: 68°27′23″S 78°11′23.5″E
- Type: Meromictic lake
- Average depth: 7.5 metres (25 ft)

Organic Lake is a lake in the Vestfold Hills in eastern Antarctica. It was formed 6,000 years ago when sea levels were higher; it is isolated, rather shallow 7.5 metres (25 ft), meromictic, a few hundred meters in diameter and has extremely salty water. It has the highest recorded concentration of dimethyl sulfide in any natural body of water.

In 2011, a new species of virophage (a satellite virus that impairs the ability of its co-infective host virus to replicate) was discovered in Organic Lake, the Organic Lake virophage. It is a parasite of 'Organic Lake phycodnavirus', a large virus that infects algae and belongs to the nucleocytoplasmic large DNA viruses (NCLDV), but in fact may rather be a member of an extended family Mimiviridae (a.k.a. Megaviridae) than of the family Phycodnaviridae.
