= Belvinaviricetes =

Virus classification
- (unranked): Virus
- Realm: Varidnaviria
- Kingdom: Abadenavirae
- Phylum: Produgelaviricota
- Class: Belvinaviricetes

Class of viruses

Belvinaviricetes is a class of viruses.

== Taxonomy ==
Belvinaviricetes has four orders, listed hereafter:

- Atroposvirales
- Belfryvirales
- Coyopavirales
- Vinavirales
