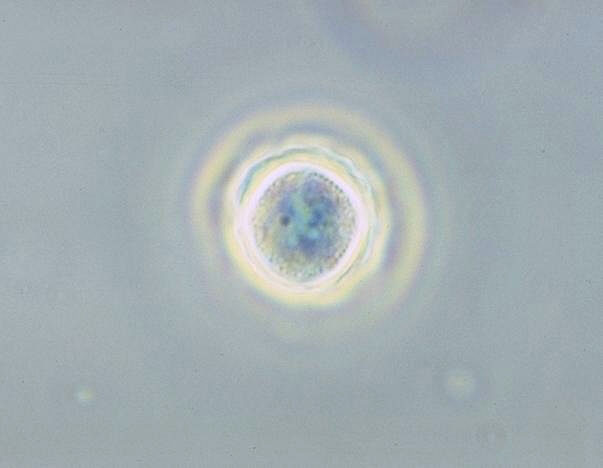
- Phase contrast micrograph of an Acanthamoeba polyphaga cyst.

Scientific classification
- Domain: Eukaryota
- Phylum: Amoebozoa
- Class: Discosea
- Order: Centramoebida
- Family: Acanthamoebidae
- Genus: Acanthamoeba; Volkonsky 1931

Type species
- Acanthamoeba castellanii Volkonsky 1931

= Acanthamoeba =

Genus of protozoans

Acanthamoeba is a genus of amoebae that are commonly recovered from soil, fresh water, and other habitats. The genus Acanthamoeba has two stages in its life cycle, the metabolically active trophozoite stage and a dormant, stress-resistant cyst stage. In nature, Acanthamoeba species are generally free-living bacterivores. However, they are also opportunistic pathogens able to cause serious and potentially fatal infections in humans and other animals.

== Distribution ==
Acanthamoeba spp. are among the most prevalent protozoa found in the environment. They are distributed worldwide, and have been isolated from soil, air, sewage, seawater, chlorinated swimming pools, domestic tap water, bottled water, dental treatment units, hospitals, air-conditioning units, and contact lens cases. Additionally, they have been isolated from human skin, nasal cavities, throats, and intestines, as well as plants and other mammals.

== Role in disease ==
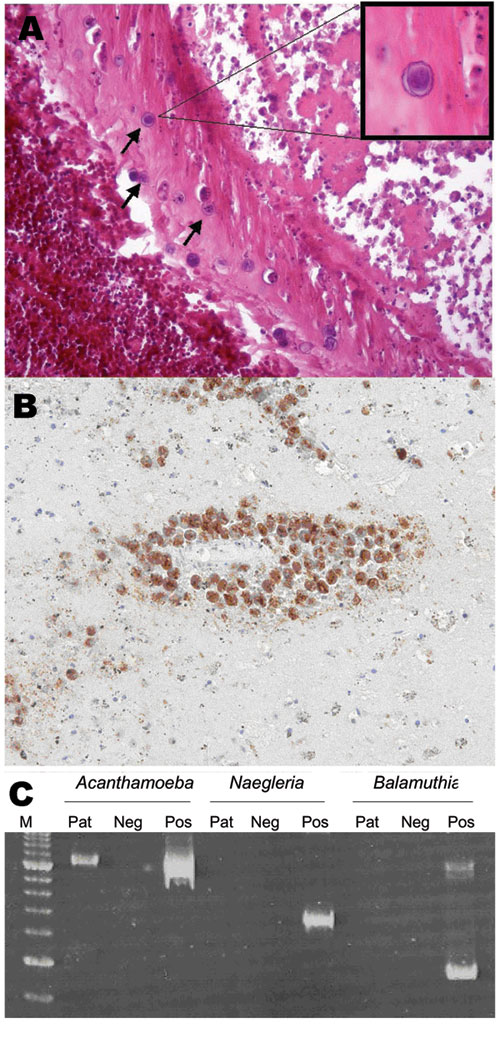
Acanthamoeba encephalitis microscopy and molecular diagnostics

Diseases caused by Acanthamoeba include keratitis and granulomatous amoebic encephalitis (GAE). The latter is often but not always seen in immunosuppressed patients. GAE is caused by the amoebae entering the body through an open wound and then spreading to the brain. The combination of host immune responses and secreted amoebal proteases causes massive brain swelling resulting in death in about 95% of those infected.

=== Granulomatous amoebic encephalitis (GAE) ===
Granulomatous amoebic encephalitis (GAE) is caused by amoebic infection of the central nervous system (CNS). It is characterized by neurological symptoms including headache, seizures, and mental-status abnormalities. These worsen progressively over weeks to months, leading to death in most patients. Infection is generally associated with underlying conditions such as immunodeficiency, diabetes, malignancies, malnutrition, systemic lupus erythematosus, and alcoholism. The parasite enters the body through cuts in the skin or by being inhaled into the upper respiratory tract. The parasite then spreads through the blood into the CNS. Acanthamoeba crosses the blood–brain barrier by means that are not yet understood. Subsequent invasion of the connective tissue and induction of pro-inflammatory responses leads to neuronal damage that can be fatal within days. Pure granulomatous lesions are rare in patients with AIDS and other related immunodeficiency states, as the patients do not have adequate numbers of CD+ve T-cells to mount a granulomatous response to Acanthamoeba infection in CNS and other organs and tissues. A perivascular cuffing with amoebae in necrotic tissue is usual finding in the AIDS and related T-cell immunodeficiency conditions.

Brain biopsy normally reveals severe oedema and hemorrhagic necrosis. A patient who has contracted this illness usually displays subacute symptoms, including altered mental status, headaches, fever, neck stiffness, seizures, and focal neurological signs (such as cranial nerve palsies and coma), all leading to death within one week to several months. Due to the rarity of this parasite and a lack of knowledge, no good diagnoses or treatments for Acanthamoeba infection are now known. Acanthamoeba keratitis cases in the past have resolved from a therapy consisting of atropine and some other drugs with no antimicrobial effects. Recent publications show atropine to interfere with the protist's CHRM1 receptor, causing cell death.

Infection usually mimics that of bacterial leptomeningitis, tuberculous meningitis, or viral encephalitis. The misdiagnosis often leads to erroneous, ineffective treatment. In the case that the Acanthamoeba is diagnosed correctly, the current treatments, such as amphotericin B, rifampicin, trimethoprim-sulfamethoxazole, ketoconazole, fluconazole, sulfadiazine, or albendazole, are only tentatively successful. Correct and timely diagnosis, as well as improved treatment methods and an understanding of the parasite, are important factors in improving the outcome of infection by Acanthamoeba. A paper published in 2013 has shown substantial effects of some FDA-approved drugs with an in vitro kill rate above 90%. These results were in vitro effects, but as the drugs are already approved, human infections can be targeted after dose calculations in clinical trials done with these diverse groups of drugs.

=== Acanthamoebic keratitis ===
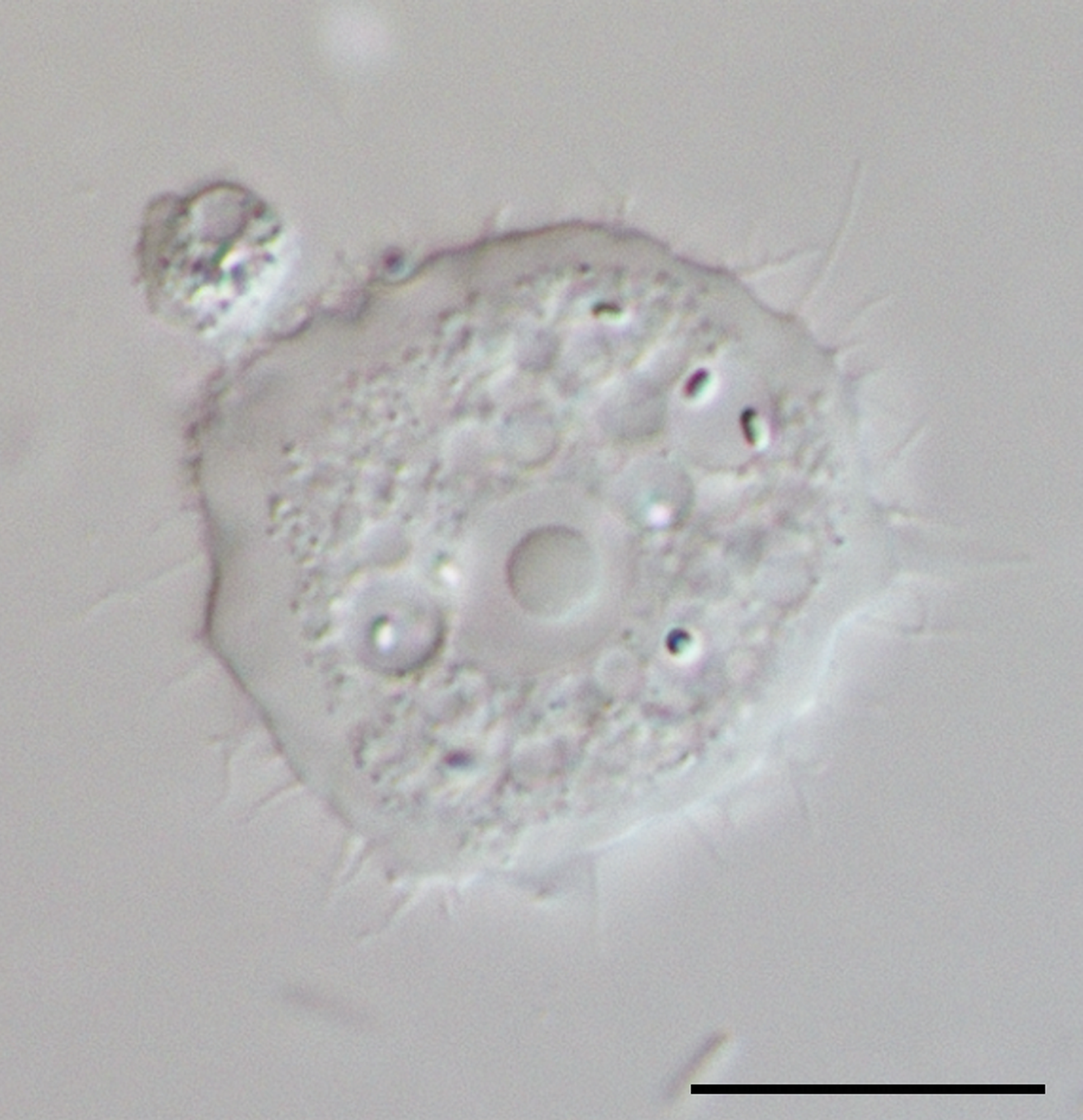
Pathogenic Acanthamoeba as seen under a light microscope; scale bar: 10 μm

When present in the eye, Acanthamoeba strains can cause acanthamoebic keratitis, which may lead to corneal ulcers or even blindness. This condition occurs most often among contact lens wearers who do not properly disinfect their lenses, exacerbated by a failure to wash hands prior to handling the lenses. Multipurpose contact lens solutions are largely ineffective against Acanthamoeba, whereas hydrogen peroxide-based solutions have good disinfection characteristics.

The first cure of a corneal infection was achieved in 1985 at Moorfields Eye Hospital.

In May 2007, Advanced Medical Optics, manufacturer of Complete Moisture Plus Contact Lens Solution products, issued a voluntary recall of their Complete Moisture Plus solutions. The fear was that contact lens wearers who used their solution were at higher risk of acanthamoebic keratitis than contact lens wearers who used other solutions. The manufacturer recalled the product after the Centers for Disease Control in the United States found that 21 people had possibly received an Acanthamoeba infection after using Complete Moisture Plus in the month prior to diagnosis.

=== As a bacterial reservoir ===
Several species of bacteria that can cause human disease are also able to infect and replicate within Acanthamoeba species. These include Legionella pneumophila, Pseudomonas aeruginosa, and some strains of Escherichia coli and Staphylococcus aureus. For some of these bacteria, replication inside Acanthamoeba has been associated with enhanced growth in macrophages, and increased resistance to some antibiotics. Furthermore, due to the high prevalence of Acanthamoeba in the environment, these amoebae have been proposed to serve as an environmental reservoir for some human pathogens.

== Ecology ==
A. castellanii can be found at high densities in various soil ecosystems. It preys on bacteria, but also fungi and other protozoa.

This species is able to lyse bacteria and produce a wide range of enzymes, such as cellulases or chitinases, and probably contributes to the breakdown of organic matter in soil, contributing to the microbial loop.

== Physiology ==
=== Role as a model organism ===
Because Acanthamoeba does not differ greatly at the ultrastructural level from a mammalian cell, it is an attractive model for cell-biology studies; it is important in cellular microbiology, environmental biology, physiology, cellular interactions, molecular biology, biochemistry, and evolutionary studies, due to the organisms' versatile roles in the ecosystem and ability to capture prey by phagocytosis, act as vectors and reservoirs for microbial pathogens, and to produce serious human infections. In addition, Acanthamoeba has been used extensively to understand the molecular biology of cell motility and cancer cell dormancy by in-depth exploration of the process of encystation.

The recently available Acanthamoeba genome sequence revealed several orthologs of genes employed in meiosis of sexual eukaryotes. These genes included Spo11, Mre11, Rad50, Rad51, Rad52, Mnd1, Dmc1, Msh, and Mlh. This finding suggests that Acanthamoeba is capable of some form of meiosis and may be able to undergo sexual reproduction.

Owing to its ease and economy of cultivation, the Neff strain of A. castellanii, discovered in a pond in Golden Gate Park in the 1960s, has been effectively used as a classic model organism in the field of cell biology. From just 30 L of simple medium inoculated with A. castellanii, about 1 kg of cells can be obtained after several days of aerated culture at room temperature. Pioneered in the laboratory of Edward D. Korn at the National Institutes of Health (NIH), many important biological molecules have been discovered and their pathways elucidated using the Acanthamoeba model. Thomas Dean Pollard applied this model at the NIH, Harvard Medical School, Johns Hopkins University School of Medicine, and the Salk Institute for Biological Studies to discover and characterize many proteins that are essential for cell motility, not only in amoebae, but also in many other eukaryotic cells, especially those of the human nervous and immune systems, the developing embryo, and cancer cells. Acanthamoeba also has served as a model to study the evolution of certain G-proteins. This unicellular eukaryote expresses few GPCRs over its cell membrane that serve vital role for the microorganism, structural homology bioinformatics tools have been used to show the presence of a homolog of human M1-muscarinic receptor in A. castellanii. Blocking these muscarinic receptors in past studies has proven to be amoebicidal in Acanthamoeba spp. More recently, voltage-gated calcium channels in Acanthamoeba spp. (CavAc) have been reported to have similarities with human voltage-gated calcium channels such as TPC-1 and L-type calcium channels and respond to Ca-channel blockers such as loperamide. This model microbe has been studied to understand complex neurodegenerative states including Alzheimer's disease. Scientists have isolated a neurotransmitter acetylcholine in Acanthamoeba and the enzymatic machinery needed for its synthesis.

=== Endosymbionts ===
Acanthamoeba spp. contain diverse bacterial endosymbionts that are similar to human pathogens, so they are considered to be potential emerging human pathogens. The exact nature of these symbionts and the benefit they represent for the amoebic host still have to be clarified. These include Legionella and Legionella-like pathogens.

=== Giant viruses ===
The giant viruses Mimivirus, Megavirus, and Pandoravirus infect Acanthamoeba.

Members of the genus Acanthamoeba are unusual in serving as hosts for a variety of giant viruses (that have more than 1000 protein-coding genes; for instance, Pandoravirus, which has about 2500 protein-coding genes in its genome).

== Diversity ==
Acanthamoeba can be distinguished from other genera of amoebae based on morphological characteristics. However, differentiating one species of Acanthamoeba from another by morphology has proven difficult. Based on 18S rDNA sequencing, known Acanthamoeba strains can be organized into 12 groups, denoted T1-T12. Most disease-causing isolates belong to type T4.

Below is a list of described species of Acanthamoeba, with sequence types noted where known. Species that have been identified in diseased patients are marked with *.

- A. astronyxis (Ray & Hayes 1954) Page 1967 * (T7)
- A. byersi Qvarnstrom, Nerad & Visvesvara 2013 *
- A. castellanii Volkonski 1931 * (T4) [A. terricola Pussard 1964]
- A. comandoni Pussard 1964 (T9)
- A. culbertsoni (Singh & Das 1970) Griffin 1972 * (T10)
- A. divionensis Pussard & Pons 1977 (T4)
- A. echinulata Pussard & Pons 1977
- A. gigantea Schmöller 1964
- A. glebae (Dobell 1914)
- A. gleichenii Volkonsky 1931
- A. griffini Sawyer 1971 (T3)
- A. hatchetti Sawyer, Visvesvara & Harke 1977 * (T11)
- A. healyi Moura, Wallace & Visvesvara 1992 (T12)
- A. hyalina Dobel & O'connor 1921
- A. jacobsi Sawyer, Nerad & Visvesvara 1992
- A. keratitis *
- A. lenticulata Molet & Ermolieff-braun 1976 (T3)
- A. lugdunensis Pussard & Pons 1977 * (T4)
- A. mauritaniensis Pussard & Pons 1977 (T4)
- A. micheli Corsaro et al. 2015
- A. palestinensis (Reich 1933) Page 1977 * (T1)
- A. paradivionensis Pussard & Pons 1977 (T4)
- A. pearcei Nerad et al. 1995
- A. polyphaga (Puschkarew 1913) Volkonsky 1931 * (T4)
- A. pustulosa Pussard & Pons 1977 (T2)
- A. pyriformis (Olive & Stoianovitch 1969) Spiegel & Shadwick 2016
- A. quina Pussard & Pons 1977 *
- A. rhysodes (Singh 1952) Griffin 1972 * (T4)
- A. royreba Willaert, Stevens & Tyndall 1978
- A. sohi Kyung-il & Shin 2003
- A. stevensoni Sawyer et al. 1993 (T11)
- A. triangularis Pussard & Pons 1977 (T4)
- A. tubiashi Lewis & Sawyer 1979 (T8)

== Etymology ==
From the Greek ἄκανθα akantha (spike/thorn), which was added before "amoeba" (change) to describe this organism as having a spine-like structure (acanthopodia). This organism is now well known as Acanthamoeba, an amphizoic, opportunistic, and nonopportunistic protozoan protist widely distributed in the environment.

== See also ==
- Acanthamoeba infection
- Balamuthia mandrillaris
