= Produgelaviricota =

Virus classification
- (unranked): Virus
- Realm: Varidnaviria
- Kingdom: Abadenavirae
- Phylum: Produgelaviricota

Phylum of viruses

Produgelaviricota is a phylum of viruses.

== Taxonomy ==
Produgelaviricota has two classes: Ainoaviricetes and Belvinaviricetes. Ainoaviricetes is monotypic down to the rank of species, i.e. the class has just one species.
