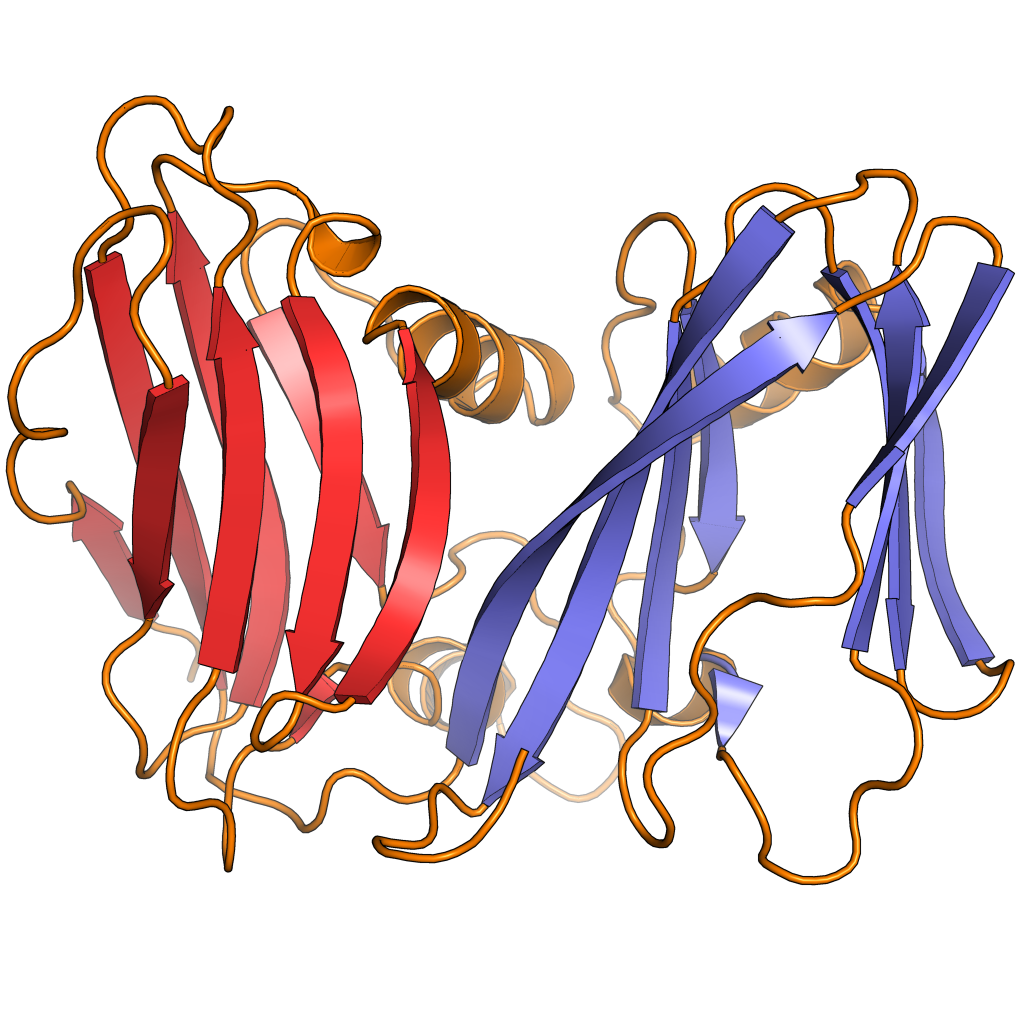
- A ribbon diagram of the DJR-MCP of bacteriophage PM2, with the two jelly roll folds colored in red and blue

Virus classification
- (unranked): Virus
- Realm: Varidnaviria

Subtaxa
- See text

Synonyms
- Non-tailed dsDNA viruses; Tailless dsDNA viruses (Note: The sole exception to these two synonyms is the family Finnlakeviridae, whose members have ssDNA genomes.)

= Varidnaviria =

Realm of viruses

Varidnaviria is a realm of viruses that includes all DNA viruses that encode major capsid proteins that contain two vertical jelly roll folds. The major capsid proteins (MCP) form into pseudohexameric subunits of the viral capsid, which stores the viral deoxyribonucleic acid (DNA). The jelly roll folds are vertical, or perpendicular, to the surface of the capsid. Apart from the double jelly roll fold MCP (DJR-MCP), most viruses in the realm share many other characteristics, such as minor capsid proteins (mCP) that has one vertical jelly roll fold, an ATPase that packages viral DNA into the capsid, a DNA polymerase that replicates the viral genome, and capsids that are icosahedral in shape.

Varidnaviria was established in 2019 based on the shared characteristics of the viruses in the realm. There are two kingdoms in the realm: Abadenavirae, which contains all prokaryotic DJR-MCP viruses except tectiviruses, and Bamfordvirae which contains tectiviruses and all eukaryotic DJR-MCP viruses. The DJR-MCP of Varidnaviria is believed to share common ancestry with the DUF2961 family of proteins, which are widespread in cellular life and which are mainly involved in carbohydrate metabolism and binding. Up to 2025, the realm included viruses that have a vertical single jelly roll (SJR) fold in the MCP, but these viruses were moved to a separate realm, Singelaviria, after it was shown that the vertical SJR and DJR folds have separate evolutionary origins.

Marine viruses in the realm are highly abundant worldwide in the upper ocean and are important in marine ecology. Many animal viruses in Varidnaviria are associated with disease, including adenoviruses, poxviruses, and the African swine fever virus. Poxviruses have been prominent in the history of medicine, especially smallpox, caused by Variola virus. The first vaccine to be invented prevented smallpox, which later became the first disease eradicated. The realm includes a number of highly unusual viruses, including giant viruses that are much larger in size and contain a significantly greater number of genes than typical viruses, and virophages, which are viruses that are parasites of giant viruses.

== Etymology ==
The name "Varidnaviria" is a portmanteau of various DNA viruses and the suffix -viria, which is the suffix used for virus realms. Double-stranded DNA (dsDNA) viruses in the realm are often called non-tailed or tailless dsDNA viruses to distinguish them from the tailed dsDNA viruses of Duplodnaviria. Members of the realm are called varidnavirians.

== Characteristics ==
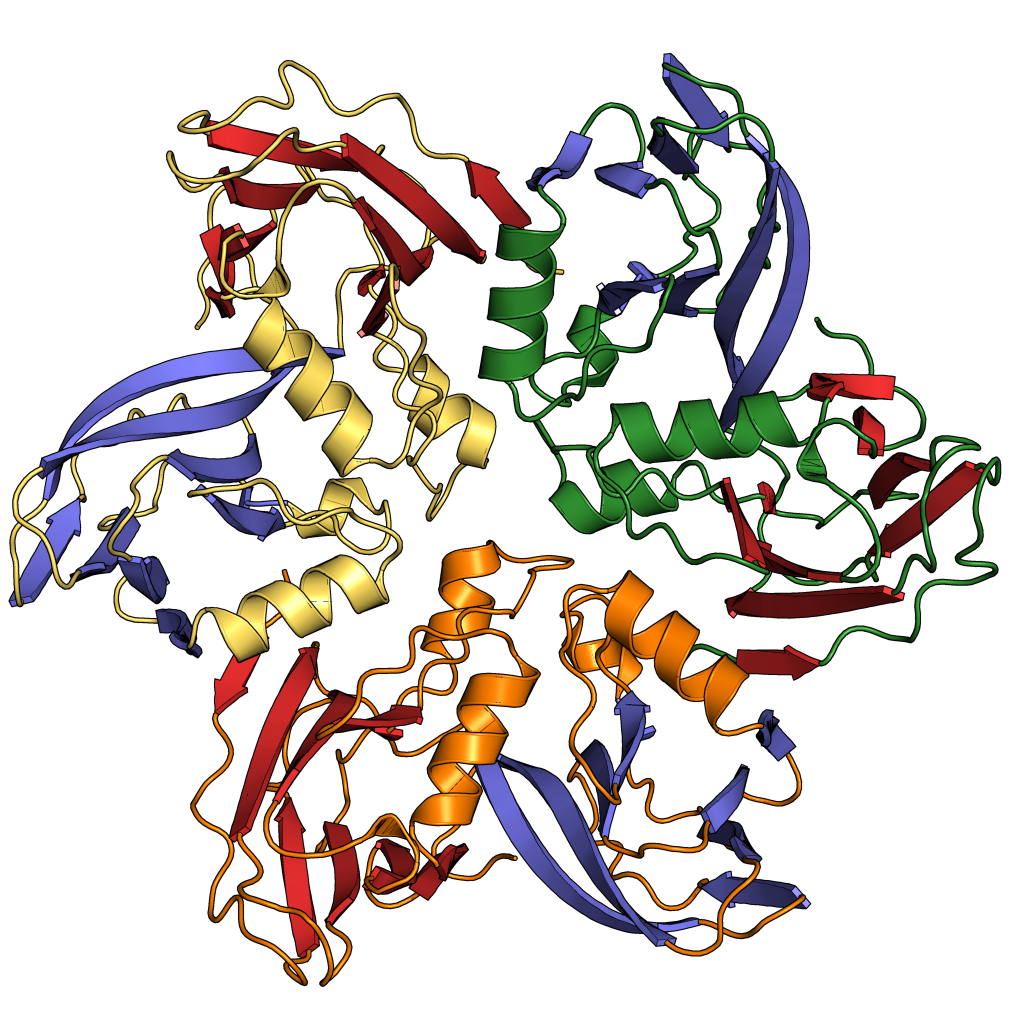
A pseudohexameric trimer of DJR-MCPs formed into a hexagonal shape. Jelly roll folds of each MCP are colored in red and blue, and the loops and helices of each MCP are colored differently to distinguish the three MCPs.

=== MCP, mCP, and ATPase ===
Most viruses in Varidnaviria contain a capsid that is made of major capsid proteins (MCPs) that contain vertical double jelly roll (DJR) folds. The major capsid proteins are named so because they are the primary proteins that the capsid is made of. A jelly roll fold is a type of folded structure in a protein in which eight antiparallel beta strands are organized into four antiparallel beta sheets in a layout resembling a jelly roll, also called a Swiss roll. Each beta strand is a specific sequence of amino acids, and these strands bond to their antiparallel strands via hydrogen bonds. A double jelly roll fold MCP is one that has two jelly roll folds in a single protein. Vertical folds are those that are perpendicular to the capsid surface, in contrast to horizontal folds that are parallel to the capsid surface.

During the process of assembling the viral capsid, MCPs self-assemble into hexagonal structures, called hexons, that contain three copies of the MCP. Hexons then bond to form the relatively flat triangular sides of the capsid, which is icosahedral in shape with 20 triangular faces and 12 vertices. All varidnavirians that encode a DJR-MCP that have been analyzed in high resolution also encode a minor capsid protein (mCP) that contains a single jelly roll fold. These mCPs assemble into pentagonal structures called pentons that contain five copies of the mCP and form the pentagonal vertices of the icosahedral capsid.

Most members of the realm also encode genome packaging ATPases of the FtsK-HerA superfamily. The ATPases in Varidnaviria are enzymes that package the viral DNA into the capsid during the process of assembling virions. FtsK-HerA is a family of proteins that contains a transmembrane domain with four membrane-spanning helices at the start of the protein's amino acid sequence, a central coiled-coil region, and an ATPase with a P-loop fold at the end of the protein's amino acid sequence. FtsK proteins are found in nearly all bacteria and HerA proteins in all archaea and some bacteria. The exact function of the ATPase for some viruses in Varidnaviria is unclear since morphological features, such as the circular, supercoiled genome of bacteriophage PM2, seemingly prohibit translocation by the ATPase of DNA from outside the capsid to the inside. The subset of the FtsK-HerA superfamily found in Varidnaviria is often called the A32 clade, named after the ATPase-encoding A32(R) gene of Vaccinia virus. The family Finnlakeviridae and the provisional Odin group lack the signature FtsK-HerA ATPase, as do adenoviruses, which instead encode their own ATPase that has the same role.

=== Other characteristics ===
Apart from the core morphogenetic triad of traits (the MCP, mCP, and ATPase), certain other characteristics are common or unique in various lineages within Varidnaviria, listed hereafter.

- All members of Varidnaviria, except for the family Finnlakeviridae, have dsDNA genomes. Viruses in Finnlakeviridae instead have single-stranded DNA (ssDNA) genomes.
- Many members of the realm encode a type B DNA polymerase, which copies the viral DNA, and often additional components of the DNA polymerase, such as superfamily 3 helicases, or replication initiation proteins in the case of the family Corticoviridae.
- Many eukaryotic DJR-MCP viruses encode a capsid maturation protease that is involved in assembling the capsid.
- Some members of the realm encode integrase, an enzyme that integrates the viral genome into the genome of the host.
- In some unrelated lineages, the ancestral icosahedral shape of the capsid has been lost and replaced with other shapes. For example, ascoviruses have ovoid virions, and pandoraviruses have amphora-shaped virions. Poxviruses retain the DJR-MCP and use it to form intermediate virions, but mature virions are brick- or ovoid-shaped.
- Some varidnavirians have special vertices in their icosahedral capsids for transporting the genome out of the capsid and for making virus factories.

== Phylogenetics ==
Varidnaviria may predate the last universal common ancestor (LUCA) of cellular life, and viruses in the realm may have been present in the LUCA. The DJR-MCP appears to share common ancestry with the GH172/DUF2961 family of proteins as they appear to be sister clades. DUF2961 proteins are widespread in both prokaryotes and eukaryotes and are mainly involved in carbohydrate metabolism and binding. They form trimers with a pseudohexagonal shape that resembles the capsomeres of viral DJR-MCPs. Other cellular proteins that appear to be distantly related to the DJR-MCP and DUF2961 proteins include peptide:N-glycosidase F (PNGase F) and peptidylglycine α-hydroxylating monooxygenase (PHM). The two jelly rolls shared by these proteins are likely the result of a gene duplication event of a cellular single jelly roll fold prior to the emergence of Varidnaviria, though it is possible that the DJR evolved independently via gene duplication in both the DUF2961 and Varidnaviria lineages.

In general, viruses in Varidnaviria do not share common descent with viruses in other realms. The main exception is the unclassified phylum Mirusviricota in the realm Duplodnaviria. Mirusviricots share some core replication and transcription-related genes with the varidnavirian phylum Nucleocytoviricota, including DNA polymerase B, RNA polymerase A, RNA polymerase B, and transcription factor TFIIS. Herpesviruses, also in Duplodnaviria, encode DNA polymerase B as well. It is proposed that this group of genes first emerged either in the ancestors of nucleocytoviricots or in the ancestors of mirusviricots and horizontally transferred to the other lineage. In both scenarios, herpesviruses lost most of them through reductive evolution. Despite the relation, mirusviricots and nucleocytoviricots belong to different realms because they have different MCPs, which are the defining characteristics of Duplodnaviria and Varidnaviria. Viruses in the realm Volvereviria and various RNA viruses in Riboviria also encode MCPs that have jelly roll folds, but they are horizontal (parallel) to the capsid surface, in contrast to the jelly roll folds of Varidnaviria, which are vertical (perpendicular) to the capsid surface.

== Classification ==
Varidnaviria has 3 phyla, 18 orders, 35 families, 101 genera, and 346 virus species as of the 2025 taxonomy release. Taxonomy is shown down to the rank of family:

- Kingdom: Abadenavirae, which contains all prokaryotic DJR-MCP viruses except tectiviruses (Tectiliviricetes)
  - Phylum: Produgelaviricota
    - Class: Ainoaviricetes
      - Order: Lautamovirales
        - Family: Finnlakeviridae
    - Class: Belvinaviricetes
      - Order: Atroposvirales
        - Family: Skuldviridae
      - Order: Belfryvirales
        - Family: Turriviridae
      - Order: Coyopavirales
        - Family: Chaacviridae
      - Order: Vinavirales
        - Family: Asemoviridae
        - Family: Autolykiviridae
        - Family: Corticoviridae
        - Family: Mestraviridae
        - Family: Parnassusviridae
- Kingdom: Bamfordvirae, which contains tectiviruses (Tectiliviricetes) and all eukaryotic DJR-MCP viruses
  - Phylum: Nucleocytoviricota
    - Class: Megaviricetes
      - Order: Algavirales
        - Family: Phycodnaviridae
      - Order: Imitervirales
        - Suborder: Orthomivirineae
          - Family: Mimiviridae
        - Suborder: Paramivirineae
          - Family: Allomimiviridae
          - Family: Mesomimiviridae
          - Family: Schizomimiviridae
      - Order: Pimascovirales
        - Suborder: Ocovirineae
          - Family: Hydriviridae
          - Family: Orpheoviridae
          - Family: Pithoviridae
        - Family: Ascoviridae
        - Family: Iridoviridae
        - Family: Marseilleviridae
      - Family: Mamonoviridae
    - Class: Mriyaviricetes
      - Family: Yaraviridae
    - Class: Pokkesviricetes
      - Order: Asfuvirales
        - Family: Asfarviridae
      - Order: Chitovirales
        - Family: Poxviridae
  - Phylum: Preplasmiviricota
    - Subphylum: Polisuviricotina
      - Class: Aquintoviricetes
        - Order: Archintovirales
          - Family: Phypoliviridae
      - Class: Pharingeaviricetes
        - Order: Rowavirales
          - Family: Adenoviridae
      - Class: Polintoviricetes
        - Order: Amphintovirales
          - Family: Eupolintoviridae
      - Class: Virophaviricetes
        - Order: Divpevirales
          - Family: Ruviroviridae
        - Order: Lavidavirales
          - Family: Maviroviridae
        - Order: Mividavirales
          - Family Spuniviroviridae
        - Order: Priklausovirales
          - Family: Burtonviroviridae
          - Family: Dishuiviroviridae
          - Family: Gulliviroviridae
          - Family: Omnilimnoviroviridae
    - Subphylum: Prepoliviricotina
      - Class: Tectilliviricetes
        - Order: Kalamavirales
          - Family: Tectiviridae

Nearly all varidnavirians belong to Group I: dsDNA viruses of the Baltimore classification system, which groups viruses together based on how they produce messenger RNA and is commonly used alongside virus taxonomy, which is based on evolutionary history. The exception is viruses of the family Finnlakeviridae in the kingdom Abadenavirae, which have ssDNA genomes and belong to Group II: ssDNA viruses in the Baltimore system. Realms are the highest level of taxonomy used for viruses and Varidnaviria is one of ten. The others are Adnaviria, Duplodnaviria, Efunaviria, Floreoviria, Pleomoviria, Riboviria, Ribozyviria, Singelaviria, and Volvereviria.

== Interactions with hosts ==
=== Disease ===
Disease-causing viruses in Varidnaviria include adenoviruses, poxviruses, and the African swine fever virus (ASFV). Adenoviruses typically cause mild respiratory, gastrointestinal, and conjunctival illnesses, but occasionally cause more severe illnesses, such as hemorrhagic cystitis, hepatitis, and meningoencephalitis. Poxviruses infect many animals and typically cause non-specific symptoms paired with a characteristic rash that is called a pox. Poxviruses include Variola virus, which causes smallpox, and Vaccinia virus, which is used as the vaccine against smallpox. ASFV is usually asymptomatic in its natural reservoirs but causes a lethal hemorrhagic fever in domestic pigs that is a concern for agricultural production.

=== Endogenization ===
Many viruses in Varidnaviria encode the enzyme integrase and integrate their genome into the genome of their host. Polintons, which constitute the class Polintoviricetes, are apparently always endogenized in their hosts. This integration of viral DNA into the host's genome is a form of horizontal gene transfer between unrelated organisms, although polintons are typically transmitted vertically from parent to child. Endogenization is common among bacterial and archaeal DJR-MCP viruses.

==== Adapative immunity ====
A peculiar example of endogenization in Varidnaviria are virophages, satellite viruses that are dependent on giant virus infection to replicate and which are assigned to the class Virophaviricetes. Virophages replicate by hijacking the replication apparati of giant viruses, thereby suppressing the number of giant virus virions produced, which increases the likelihood of host survival. Some virophages are able to become endogenized, and this endogenization can be considered a form of adaptive immunity for the host against giant virus infection.

=== Viral shunt ===
Algal viruses of the family Phycodnaviridae play an important role in controlling algal blooms and, along with other marine viruses, contribute to a process called viral shunt, whereby organic material from killed organisms are "shunted" by viruses away from higher trophic levels and recycled for consumption by organisms at lower trophic levels. Bacteriophages in Varidnaviria are similarly a potential major cause of death among marine prokaryotes due to their large numbers. Autolykiviruses, a group of marine bacterial viruses, have broad host ranges that enable them to infect and kill many different bacteria species.

== History ==
Diseases caused by poxviruses have been known for much of recorded history. Smallpox in particular has been highly prominent in modern medicine. The first vaccine to be invented protected against smallpox, and smallpox would later become the first disease to be eradicated. Human adenoviruses were the first DJR-MCP viruses in Varidnaviria to have their MCPs analyzed. They stood out for having jelly roll folds that were perpendicular, rather than parallel, to the capsid surface. In 1999, the structure of the MCP of bacteriophage PRD1 was resolved, which showed that the DJR-MCP lineage included prokaryotic viruses.

Over time, the use of metagenomics has allowed for the identification of many viruses in the environment without identification of the host or with laboratory specimens. With the increased knowledge of the viruses of the realm, Varidnaviria was established in 2019 based on the shared traits of viruses in the realm. Metagenomic studies suggest that varidnavirians are the most common group of viruses in the upper oceans, where they make up 50–90% of detected viruses and may be more numerous than tailed dsDNA viruses of Duplodnaviria, the largest and most diverse lineage of viruses documented.

Up to 2025, Varidnaviria included viruses that have a single vertical jelly roll fold MCP (SJR-MCP) in the kingdom Helvetiavirae, now classified in the realm Singelaviria. It was believed at first that the DJR-MCP of Varidnaviria was the result of a gene fusion event of the SJR-MCPs of Singelaviria since singelavirians encode two SJR-MCPs that form homo- and heterodimers in capsomeres that resemble the capsomeres of DJR-MCPs. The discovery of cellular proteins that contain a DJR-fold, however, led to further research that showed that the DJR MCPs of Varidnaviria likely evolved from said cellular proteins independent from vertical SJR-MCP viruses. Because of this, the SJR-MCP-encoding viruses of Helvetiavirae were given their own realm, Singelaviria.

== See also ==
- List of higher virus taxa
