= Coalville Meadows =

Biological Site of Special Scientific Interest in Leicestershire, England

Coordinates: 52.73°N 1.34°W

- Site of Special Scientific Interest
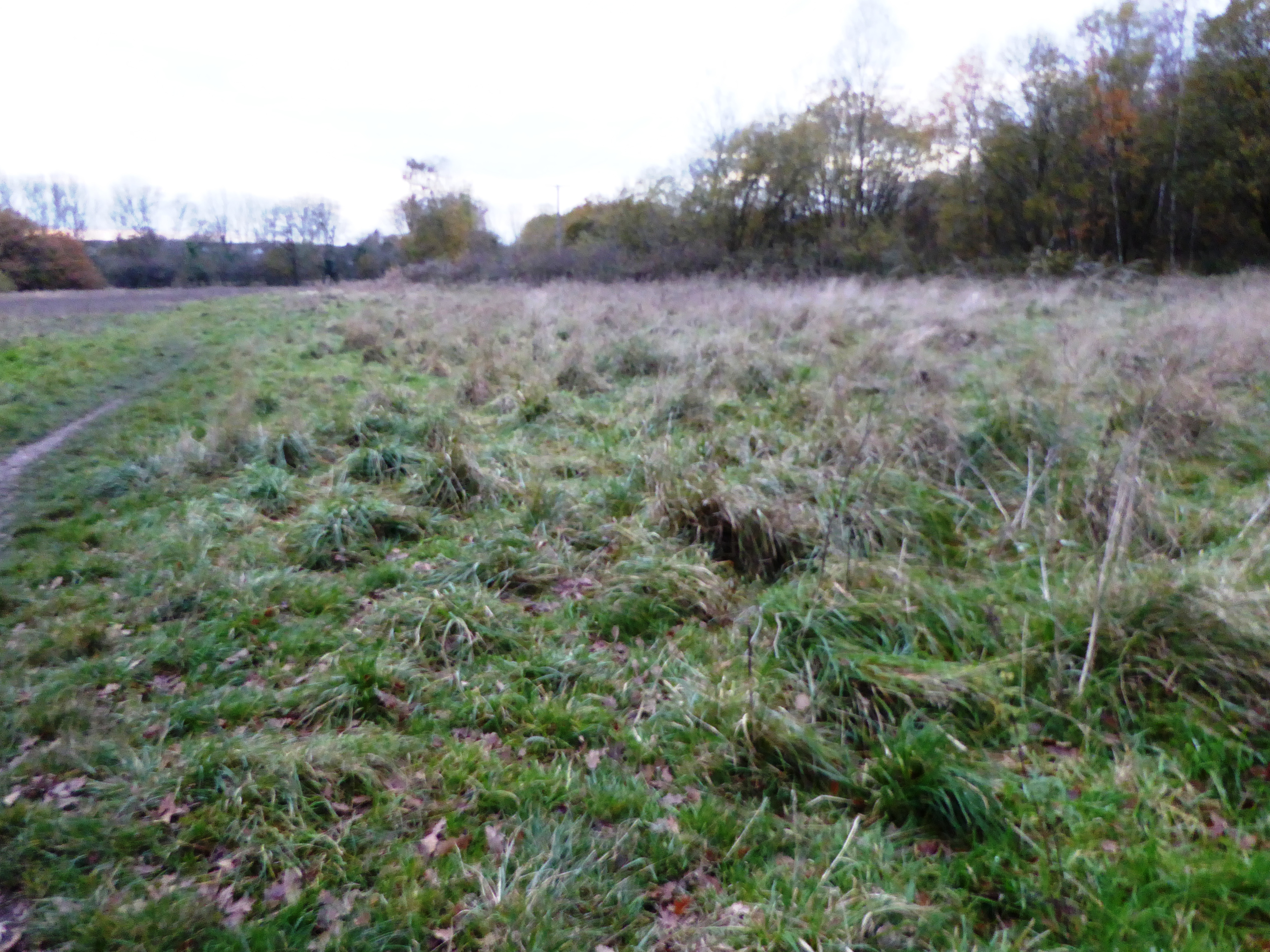
- Location of Coalville Meadows.
- Area of search: Leicestershire
- Grid reference: SK 446 151
- Interest: Biological
- Area: 6.0 hectares (15 acres)
- Notification date: 1983
- Location map: Magic Map

Coalville Meadows is a 6.0 hectares (15 acres) biological Site of Special Scientific Interest between Whitwick and Coalville in Leicestershire. It is managed by the Friends of Holly Hayes Wood.

It is one of the best examples of neutral grassland that has developed on the somewhat leached clay soils of Leicestershire and is representative of such grassland in Central and Eastern England. It is bounded on the West by a former minerals railway line, to the South by social housing, the east by Holly Hayes Woodland, and to the North by an aggregate storage area, and have developed on soils derived from the clays of the Triassic Keuper Marl. The grassland is poorly drained and is dominated by tufted hair-grass Deschampsia caespitosa, Yorkshire fog Holcus lanatus, red fescue Festuca rubra and great burnet Sanguisorba officinalis. Additionally, flora typical of relatively base-poor clay soils, such as pignut Conopodium majus, betony Betonica officinalis, heath bedstraw Galium saxatile, tormentil Potentilla erecta, devil's-bit scabious Succisa pratensis, and mat grass Nardus stricta, are present. The grassland also includes typical meadow species as saw-wort Serratula tinctoria, meadow thistle Cirsium dissectum, knapweed Centaurea nigra and lady's smock Cardamine pratensis.

In 2008, the site was bought by the Friends of Holly Hayes Wood who wanted to see the meadow land restored to its former glory. The group is working with Natural England to re-establish appropriate maintenance which it hoped will lead to a more appropriate 'favourable' status and to ensure that the meadow is meeting its conservation objectives.

There is access to the site from the Ivanhoe Way footpath.
