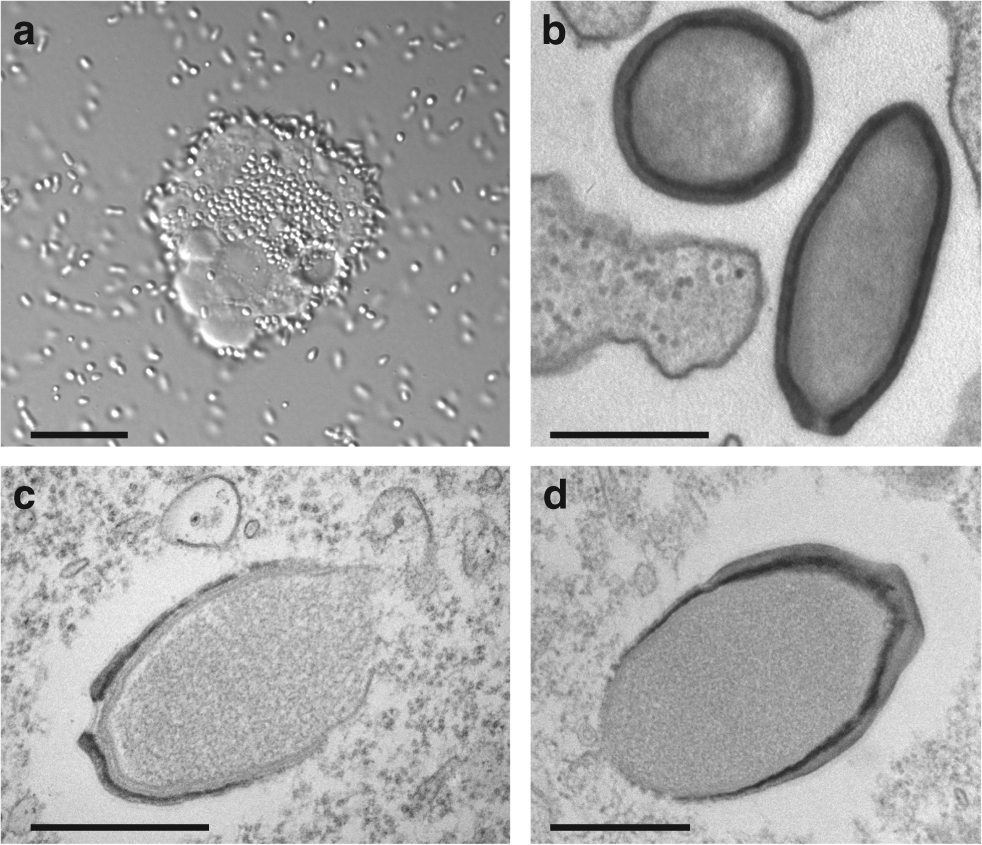
- Pandoravirus virion

Virus classification
- (unranked): Virus
- Realm: Varidnaviria
- Kingdom: Bamfordvirae
- Phylum: Nucleocytoviricota
- Class: Megaviricetes
- Order: Algavirales (?)
- Family: Pandoraviridae
- Genus: Pandoravirus

Species
- Pandoravirus braziliensis; Pandoravirus dulcis; Pandoravirus hades; Pandoravirus inopinatum; Pandoravirus kadiweu; Pandoravirus massiliensis; Pandoravirus pampulha; Pandoravirus persephone; Pandoravirus salinus; Pandoravirus tropicalis; Pandoravirus yedoma

= Pandoravirus =

Genus of giant virus possessing a large double-stranded DNA genome

Pandoravirus is a proposed genus of giant virus, first discovered in 2013. It is the fourth largest in physical size of any known viral genus, behind Pithovirus, Klothovirus casanovai, and Megaklothovirus. Pandoraviruses have double stranded DNA genomes, with the largest genome size (2.5 million base pairs) of any known viral genus.

== Discovery ==
The discovery of Pandoraviruses by a team of French scientists, led by husband and wife Jean-Michel Claverie and Chantal Abergel, was announced in a report in the journal Science in July 2013. Other scientists had previously observed the pandoravirus particles, but owing to their enormous size they were not expected to be viruses. Patrick Scheid, a parasitologist from the Central Institute of the Bundeswehr Medical Service in Koblenz, Germany, found one in 2008, in an amoeba living in the contact lens of a woman with keratitis. Its development within the amoebal host was documented extensively. Unlike in other cases with such giant viruses, the large particles within Acanthamoeba were not mistaken for bacteria. The authors initially termed them "endocytobionts".

Mimivirus, a nucleocytoplasmic large DNA virus with a genome size of about 1.1 megabases, was described in 1992 but not recognized as a virus until 2003. Megavirus, discovered in seawater off the coast of Chile in 2011, has a genome size of approximately 1.2 megabases.

The prior discovery of these viruses prompted a search for other types of large amoeba-infecting viruses, which led to the finding of two species; Pandoravirus salinus, found in seawater taken from the coast of Chile, with a genome size of ~2.5 megabases, and Pandoravirus dulcis, found in a shallow freshwater pond in La Trobe University, Melbourne, Australia, with a 1.9 megabase genome.

== Description ==
Pandoraviruses are oval in shape and are about 1 micrometer (1000 nanometers) in length. Other viruses range from 25 to 100 nanometers. In addition to being large physically, Pandoraviruses have a large genome made up of 2,500 genes, compared to only 10 genes on average in other viruses. For example, the Influenza A virus contains 8 genes and HIV contains only 9 genes. Gene content varies among species of Pandoravirus, with Pandoravirus salinus containing 2,500 genes and Pandoravirus dulcis containing about 1,500 genes. Pandoraviruses were originally mistaken for bacteria; however, they lack some of the characteristics of bacteria, such as the ability to make their own proteins. The dissimilarity of the remaining genes to any cellular genes led researchers to speculate that this virus represents a previously unknown branch of the tree of life. However, other experts have called this proposal premature because there is very little evidence supporting the idea.

== Replication ==
Pandoraviruses have double stranded DNA. Like most giant viruses, Pandoraviruses have a viral replication cycle. They lack the ability to make their own proteins, rely on the host cells for ATP (energy) and replication, and also do not contain ribosomes or produce energy to divide. Under the microscope, scientists observed the virus enter the amoeba through fusion with membrane vacuoles, and integrate their DNA into the host cells. The host cell replicates the viral particles and eventually splits open, releasing the viral particles. The process of replication lasts 10–15 hours. Viral replication and assembly happens simultaneously. In other words, viral DNA is replicated within the cytoplasm of the host cell and assembled into new viral particles followed by lysis of the host cell.

== Prevalence in the environment ==
Pandoraviruses do not seem to be harmful to humans. They are mostly found in marine environments, infecting amoebae. One reason for their only relatively recent discovery is because they exist in environments that are not well studied. Pandoraviruses, like other marine viruses, infect plankton, which are organisms that live in the water column and form the basis of the food chain for other marine species. More study and research needs to be done in order to confirm the prevalence of Pandoraviruses in different environments. Currently, not much is known about their role in marine ecosystems. However, viruses are not mere pathogens for their host, but are also key players in aquatic ecosystems and the biosphere. Almost all genomes of cellular organisms contain viral sequences, elements of which are also essential in gene regulation. Viral infection and lysis can influence community structure, as well as the transfer of matter and energy in aquatic ecosystems. They can also dramatically alter host physiology through viral gene expression and drive evolutionary innovation through virus-mediated horizontal gene transfer.

== Comparison with other giant viruses ==
Other giant viruses such as the Mimivirus, Pithovirus, and Megavirus have much smaller genomes. For example, Mimivirus, considered one of the largest giant viruses, has a genome size of 1.1 million base pairs compared to 2.5 million base pairs for Pandoraviruses. Another feature that is different in Pandoraviruses compared to other giant viruses is the replication cycle. Pandoraviruses infect amoebas, which are single celled eukaryotes. Pandoravirus enters amoebas through phagocytic vacuoles, then fuses with the membrane vacuole of the amoeba. This leads to viral particles to be released into the cytoplasm of the amoeba.

== See also ==
- DNA virus
- Introduction to viruses
- Largest organisms
- List of viruses
- Microbiology
- Virology
- Virus classification
