= Gromford Meadow =

Protected area in Suffolk, England

Coordinates: 52.175°N 1.488°E

- Site of Special Scientific Interest
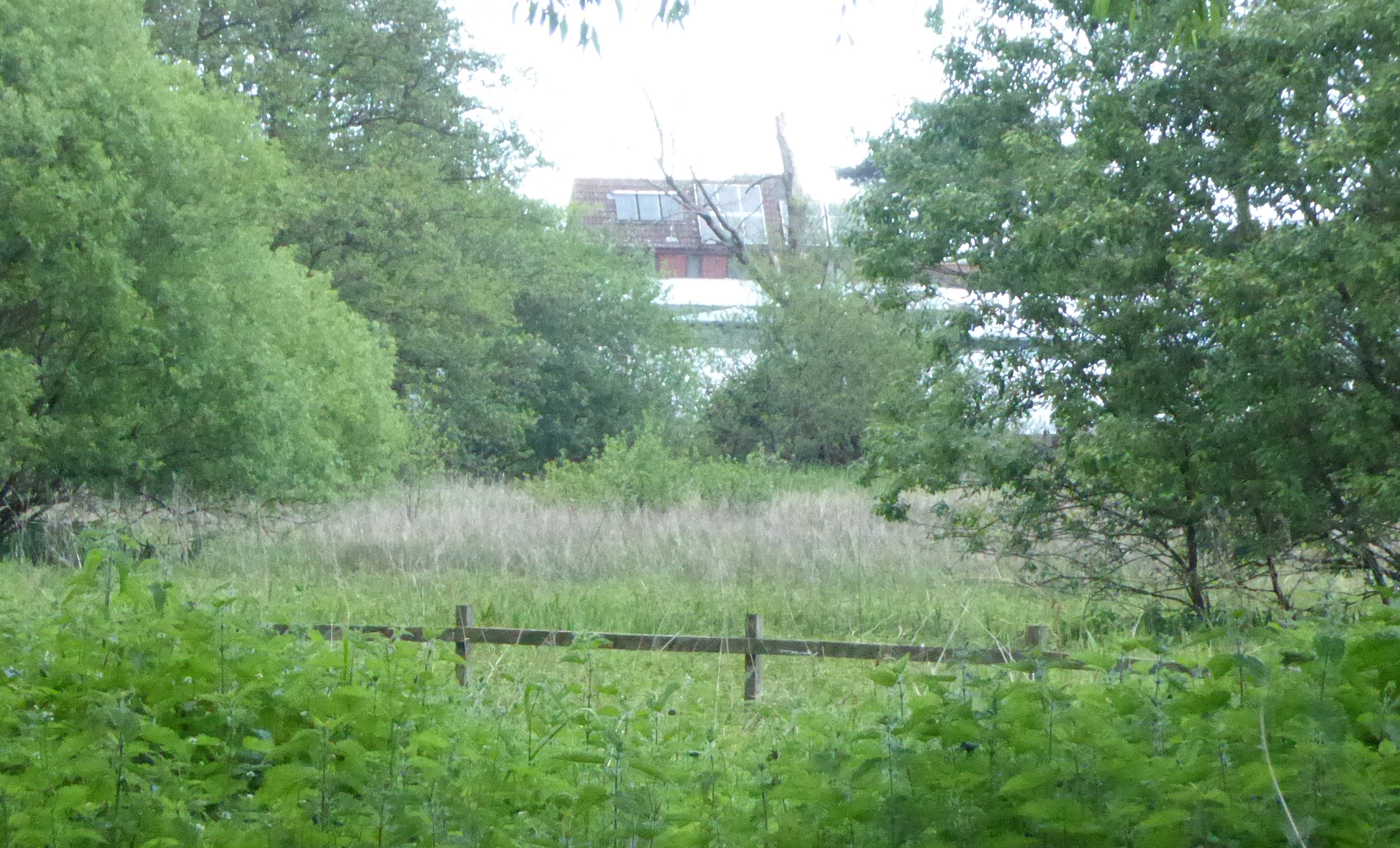
- Location of Gromford Meadow.
- Area of search: Suffolk
- Grid reference: TM 386 587
- Interest: Biological
- Area: 1.7 hectares
- Notification date: 1984
- Location map: Magic Map

Gromford Meadow is a 1.7-hectare biological Site of Special Scientific Interest in Gromford, south of Saxmundham in Suffolk.

This unimproved base-rich meadow is fed by springs. It has diverse flora with meadowsweet dominant, and other plants include yellow rattle, meadow foxtail, ragged robin, marsh thistle and lesser spearwort.

The site is private land with no public access.
