= Pandoravirus tropicalis =

Virus classification
- (unranked): Virus
- Realm: Varidnaviria
- Kingdom: Bamfordvirae
- Phylum: Nucleocytoviricota
- Class: Megaviricetes
- Order: Algavirales (?)
- Family: Pandoraviridae
- Genus: Pandoravirus
- Species: Pandoravirus tropicalis

Species of virus

Pandoravirus tropicalis is a virus belonging to the genus Pandoravirus. It was isolated from water samples taken from the artificial lake Lake Pampulha in Brazil.
