= Pandoravirus dulcis =

Virus classification
- (unranked): Virus
- Realm: Varidnaviria
- Kingdom: Bamfordvirae
- Phylum: Nucleocytoviricota
- Class: Megaviricetes
- Order: Algavirales (?)
- Family: Pandoraviridae
- Genus: Pandoravirus
- Species: Pandoravirus dulcis

Species of virus

Pandoravirus dulcis is an egg-shaped virus of genus Pandoravirus, that was discovered in a shallow lake at La Trobe University, Melbourne, Australia in 2013. The virus contains around 1.9 million DNA bases and about 1500 genes. It infects amoeba living in pond water. Along with Pandoravirus salinus, and around one micrometre in size, it is one of the largest viruses ever identified.
