= Base-richness =

Bases' water or soil level

In ecology, base-richness is the level of chemical bases in water or soil, such as calcium, potassium or magnesium ions. Bases are known as ions that react with the positively charged hydrogen in an acid and work to neutralize one another. In soils, bases are often essential nutrients to plants' development and can stabilize soil pH. Many organisms prefer base-rich environments as they are often supportive of life processes and cellular function.

Chemical bases are alkalis or alkaline earth metals, hence base-rich environments are either neutral or alkaline (pH>7). Acid-rich environments have few bases, they are dominated by environmental acids, usually organic acids or cations such as aluminum and hydrogen. There is a positive correlation between base-richness and calcium (Ca), magnesium(Mg), and carbonates (HCO3), and a negative correlation with pH, Iron (Fe), Manganese (Mn), and Aluminum (Al).

Base-rich terrestrial environments are characteristic of areas where underlying rocks (below soil) are limestone. Seawater is also base-rich, so maritime and marine environments are themselves base-rich. Base-poor environments are characteristic of areas where underlying rocks (below soil) are sandstone or granite, or where the water is derived directly from rainfall (ombrotrophic).

There is no correlation between base-richness and availability of nitrogen (N), phosphorus (P), and potassium (K). These three nutrients are the primary macronutrients required for plant growth and are often monitored in soil.

== Base-richness and Soil Properties ==
Soil properties, such as cation exchange capacity (CEC) and anion exchange capacity (AEC) impact how ions are held by the soil. Soils mainly have a net negative charge due to the presence of clays and organic matter which attracts positively charged ions, known as cations. A higher CEC means there is a greater holding capacity of cations that can work to influence the presence of bases in the soil profile. Sandy soils or those with a lower organic matter content have lower CEC and higher nutrient leaching.

Soils parent material greatly influence the presence of basic ions in soil as well. Limestone a sedimentary rock, composed of mainly calcium carbonate ($\ce{CaCO3}$) and may contain magnesium carbonate as well. As the limestone is weathered these materials enter the soil profile and can become part of the bases present. Lime is also commonly used as a soil additive to help decrease acidity.

== Roles of Base Cations in Soils ==
Calcium (Ca^{2+}) is a secondary nutrient that helps with stabilizing cell walls, root permeability and increasing enzyme activity.

Magnesium (Mg^{2+}) is another secondary or meso nutrient and is a component of chlorophyll, required for photosynthesis. This nutrient also allows plants to perform multiple metabolic processes including protein synthesis and energy transfer. It is found in primary and secondary minerals, attached to soil colloids or moving freely in the soil solution as it is a mobile nutrient.

Potassium ($\ce{K+}$) is another base commonly found in soils. Potassium is a primary nutrient and is required for regulating gas exchange and translocation.

== Examples of base-rich environments ==
- Calcareous grassland
- Fen
- Limestone pavement
- Maquis shrubland
- Yew woodland

== Examples of base-poor environments ==
- Bog
- Heath (habitat)
- Poor fen
- Moorland
- Pine woodland
- Tundra

== See also ==
- Soil
- Calcicole
- Calcifuge
- Total boron
