= Artificial seawater =

Mixture of dissolved salts simulating the mean seawater composition

Artificial seawater (abbreviated ASW) is a mixture of dissolved mineral salts (and sometimes vitamins) that simulates seawater. Artificial seawater is primarily used in marine biology and in marine and reef aquaria, and allows the easy preparation of media appropriate for marine organisms (including algae, bacteria, plants and animals). From a scientific perspective, artificial seawater has the advantage of reproducibility over natural seawater since it is a standardized formula. Artificial seawater is also known as synthetic seawater and substitute ocean water.

== Industrial and laboratory formulations ==
A smaller but significant use is in laboratory or fire-fighting applications. In industrial and materials-science contexts, artificial seawater refers to a chemically defined electrolyte used to reproduce the ionic composition and conductivity of natural ocean water for corrosion testing, electrochemical research, and sensor calibration.

The most widely cited formulation, ASTM D1141, specifies concentrations of sodium, chloride, sulfate, magnesium, calcium, potassium, bromide, and strontium that approximate the average composition of seawater with a salinity of about 35 g kg⁻¹. This mixture is deliberately simplified and excludes organic matter or biological nutrients so that the chemical environment is reproducible from batch to batch. It is commonly employed in laboratory methods such as ASTM G31 (immersion corrosion testing), ASTM G44 (alternate immersion), ASTM G78 (crevice corrosion), and the international standard ISO 11130 for corrosion of metals and alloys under controlled conditions.

By contrast, aquarium and aquaculture formulations of artificial seawater—sold under trade names such as Instant Ocean and Reef Crystals—are designed to sustain marine organisms rather than to model corrosion processes. These products include trace nutrients such as iron, iodine, molybdenum, and zinc; carbonate–bicarbonate buffers to stabilize pH near 8.2; and sometimes vitamins or chelating agents to support biological systems. Because such ingredients can introduce organic films, complexing agents, or variable redox chemistry, aquarium formulations are unsuitable for standardized corrosion or electrochemical testing.

Artificial seawater used for corrosion studies is typically prepared with analytical-grade salts and deionized or distilled water, mixed shortly before use, and replaced periodically to prevent pH drift, precipitation, or contamination. Test solutions may be aerated, deaerated, or maintained at fixed temperatures depending on the procedure. The focus is on chemical reproducibility and electrochemical representativeness, rather than biological realism.

Comparison of artificial seawater types
Aspect	Aquarium / Marine Biology Use	Corrosion and Engineering Use
Primary purpose	Support marine life; biological fidelity	Reproduce ionic strength and corrosivity for standardized tests
Standards or references	Commercial reef-salt recipes; UNESCO (1981) seawater tables	ASTM D1141; ISO 11130; ASTM G31 series
Typical additives	Nutrients, vitamins, trace metals, organics	None — sterile, inorganic only
Buffering system	Carbonate/bicarbonate to stabilize pH ≈ 8.2	Usually unbuffered or controlled with CO₂ exclusion
Analytical priority	Biological health (salinity, alkalinity, Ca²⁺, Mg²⁺)	Ionic reproducibility, conductivity, chloride/sulfate ratio
Longevity in use	Weeks to months (with aeration)	Hours to days (freshly mixed for each exposure)

== Example ==
The tables below present an example of an artificial seawater (35.00 ‰ of salinity) preparation devised by Kester, Duedall, Connors and Pytkowicz (1967). The recipe consists of two lists of mineral salts, the first of anhydrous salts that can be weighed out, the second of hydrated salts that should be added to the artificial seawater as a solution.

Anhydrous salts
Salt	Molecular weight	g kg^{−1} solution
Sodium chloride (NaCl)	58.44	23.926
Sodium sulfate (Na_{2}SO_{4})	142.04	4.008
Potassium chloride (KCl)	74.56	0.677
Sodium bicarbonate (NaHCO_{3})	84.00	0.196
Potassium bromide (KBr)	119.01	0.098
Boric acid (H_{3}BO_{3})	61.83	0.026
Sodium fluoride (NaF)	41.99	0.003

Hydrated salts
Salt	Molecular weight	mol kg^{−1} solution
Magnesium chloride (MgCl_{2}.6H_{2}O)	203.33	0.05327
Calcium chloride (CaCl_{2}.2H_{2}O)	147.03	0.01033
Strontium chloride (SrCl_{2}.6H_{2}O)	266.64	0.00009

While all the compounds listed in the recipe above are inorganic, mineral salts, some artificial seawater recipes, such as that of Goldman and McCarthy (1978), also add trace solutions of vitamins and organic compounds needed by marine organisms.

== Standard ==
The International Standard for making artificial seawater can be found at ASTM International. The current standard code is ASTM D1141-98 (the original standard was ASTM D1141-52) and describes the standard practice for the preparation of substitute ocean water. The ASTM D1141-98 standard is available in a ready-made artificial seawater form or as a "Sea Salt" mix that scientists and hobbyists can prepare. Generally, the ready-made artificial seawater comes in 1 gallon and 5 gallon containers, whereas the "Sea Salt" mix comes in 20 lb pails (makes approximately 57 gallons) and 50 lb pails (makes approximately 143 gallons).

=== Uses and applications ===
There are various applications for ASTM D1141-98 synthetic seawater including corrosion studies, ocean instrument calibration and chemical processing. Typically, laboratory-grade water is used for preparing synthetic seawater.

== See also ==
- Algaculture
- Aquarium
- ASTM D1141
- Corrosion testing
- Marine coatings
- Electrochemistry
