= Pandoravirus yedoma =

Virus classification
- (unranked): Virus
- Realm: Varidnaviria
- Kingdom: Bamfordvirae
- Phylum: Nucleocytoviricota
- Class: Megaviricetes
- Order: Algavirales (?)
- Family: Pandoraviridae
- Genus: Pandoravirus
- Species: Pandoravirus yedoma

Prehistoric virus discovered in 2022 at Siberian Permafrost

Pandoravirus yedoma is a virus that originated 48,500 years ago which was discovered in the deep Siberian permafrost in 2022. The scientists also revived 13 new pathogens and characterized them as 'zombie viruses'. It has been shown to infect amoeba cells (particularly A. castellanii) killing them in the process.
