= Pithoviridae =

Virus classification
- (unranked): Virus
- Realm: Varidnaviria
- Kingdom: Bamfordvirae
- Phylum: Nucleocytoviricota
- Class: Megaviricetes
- Order: Pimascovirales
- Suborder: Ocovirineae
- Family: Pithoviridae

Family of viruses

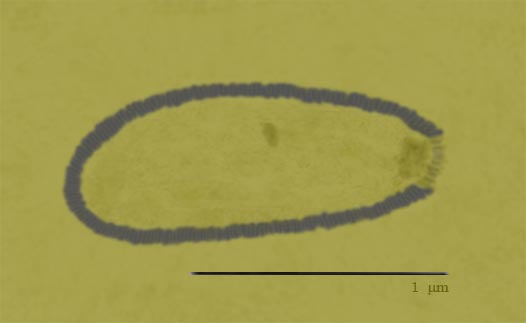
Sketch of the Pithovirus sibericum virus

Pithoviridae is a family of viruses.

== Taxonomy ==
Pithiviridae contains two subfamilies that are both monotypic down to their sole genera. This taxonomy is shown hereafter:

- Subfamily: Orthocedratvirinae
  - Genus: Alphacedratvirus
- Subfamily: Orthopithovirinae
  - Genus: Alphapithovirus
