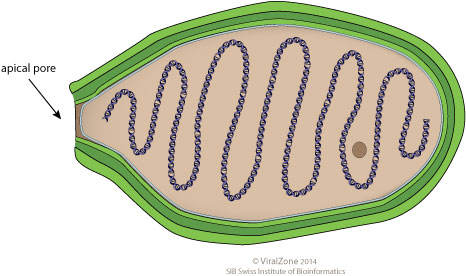
- Pandoravirus virion

Virus classification
- (unranked): Virus
- Realm: Varidnaviria
- Kingdom: Bamfordvirae
- Phylum: Nucleocytoviricota
- Class: Megaviricetes
- Order: Algavirales (?)
- Family: Pandoraviridae

Genera
- Pandoravirus

= Pandoraviridae =

Family of viruses

Pandoraviridae is a proposed family of double-stranded DNA viruses that infect amoebae. There is only one genus in this family: Pandoravirus. Several species in this genus have been described, including Pandoravirus dulcis, Pandoravirus salinus and Pandoravirus yedoma.

== History ==
The viruses were discovered in 2013.

== Description ==
The viruses in this family are the second largest known virus (~1 micrometer) in capsid length, after Pithovirus (1.5 micrometer). Pandoravirus has the largest viral genome known, containing double-stranded DNA of 1.9 to 2.5 megabase pairs.

== Evolution ==
These viruses may be related to the phycodnaviruses.
