= Seawater =

Water from a sea or an ocean

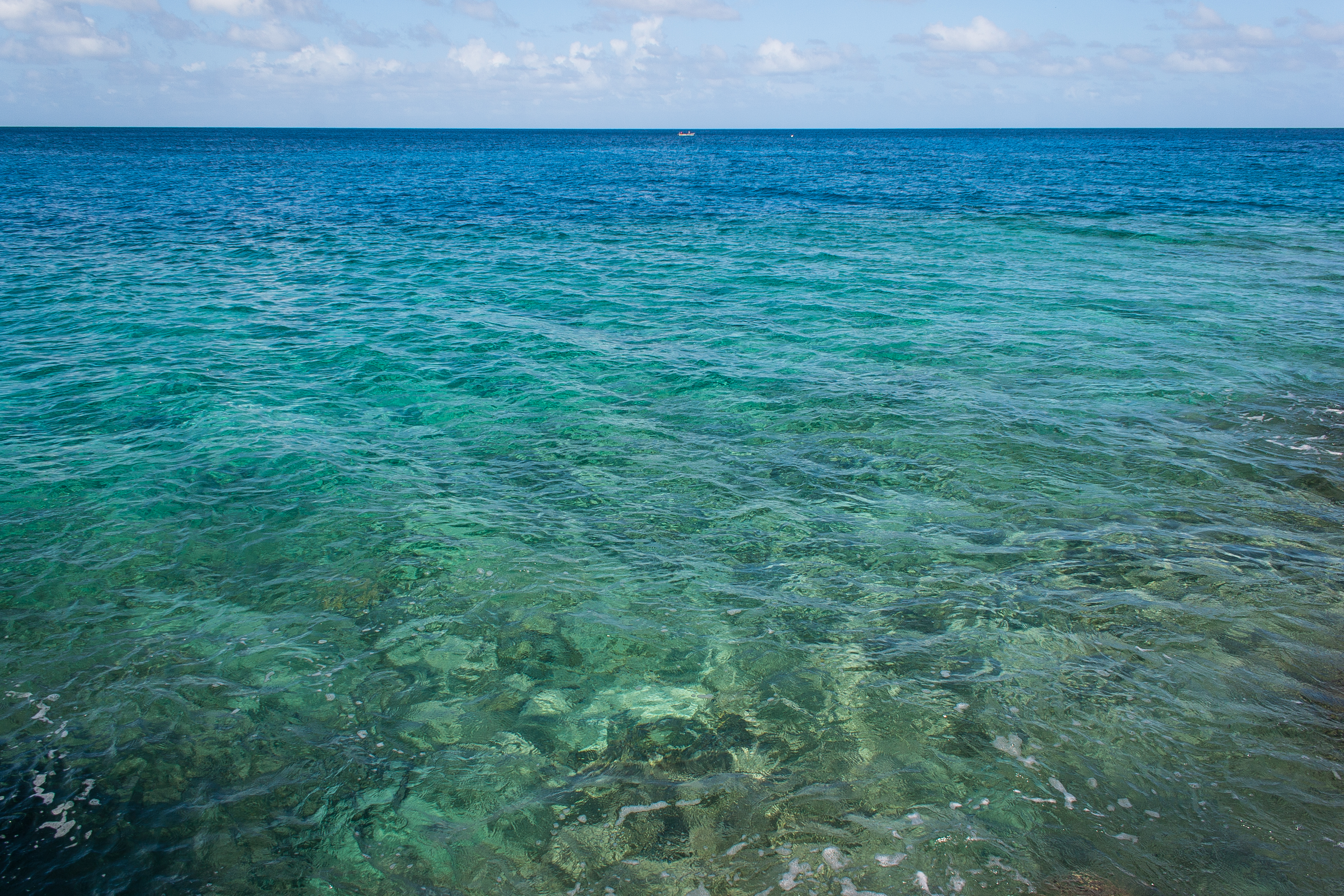
Seawater of San Andrés

Temperature-salinity diagram of changes in density of water

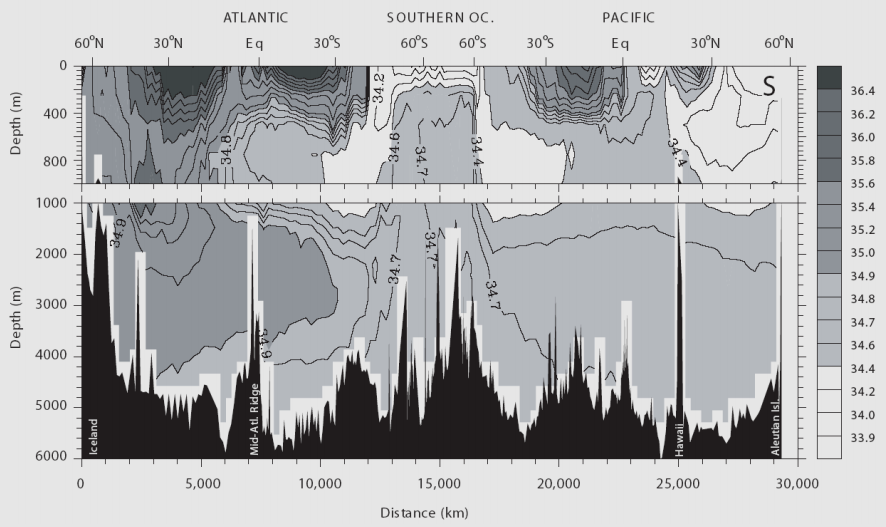
Ocean salinity at different latitudes in the Atlantic and Pacific

Seawater, or sea water, is water from a sea or ocean. On average, seawater in the world's oceans has a salinity of about 3.5% (35 g/L, 35 ppt, 600 mM). This means that every kilogram (roughly one liter by volume) of seawater has approximately 35 grams (1.2 oz) of dissolved salts (predominantly sodium (Na^{+}) and chloride (Cl^{−}) ions). The average density at the surface is 1.025 kg/L. Seawater is denser than both fresh water and pure water (density 1.0 kg/L at 4 °C (39 °F)) because the dissolved salts increase the mass by a larger proportion than the volume. The freezing point of seawater decreases as salt concentration increases. At typical salinity, it freezes at about −2 °C (28 °F). The coldest seawater still in the liquid state ever recorded was found in 2010, in a stream under an Antarctic glacier: the measured temperature was −2.6 °C (27.3 °F).

Seawater pH is typically limited to a range between 7.5 and 8.4. However, there is no universally accepted reference pH-scale for seawater and the difference between measurements based on different reference scales may be up to 0.14 units.

== Properties ==
=== Salinity ===
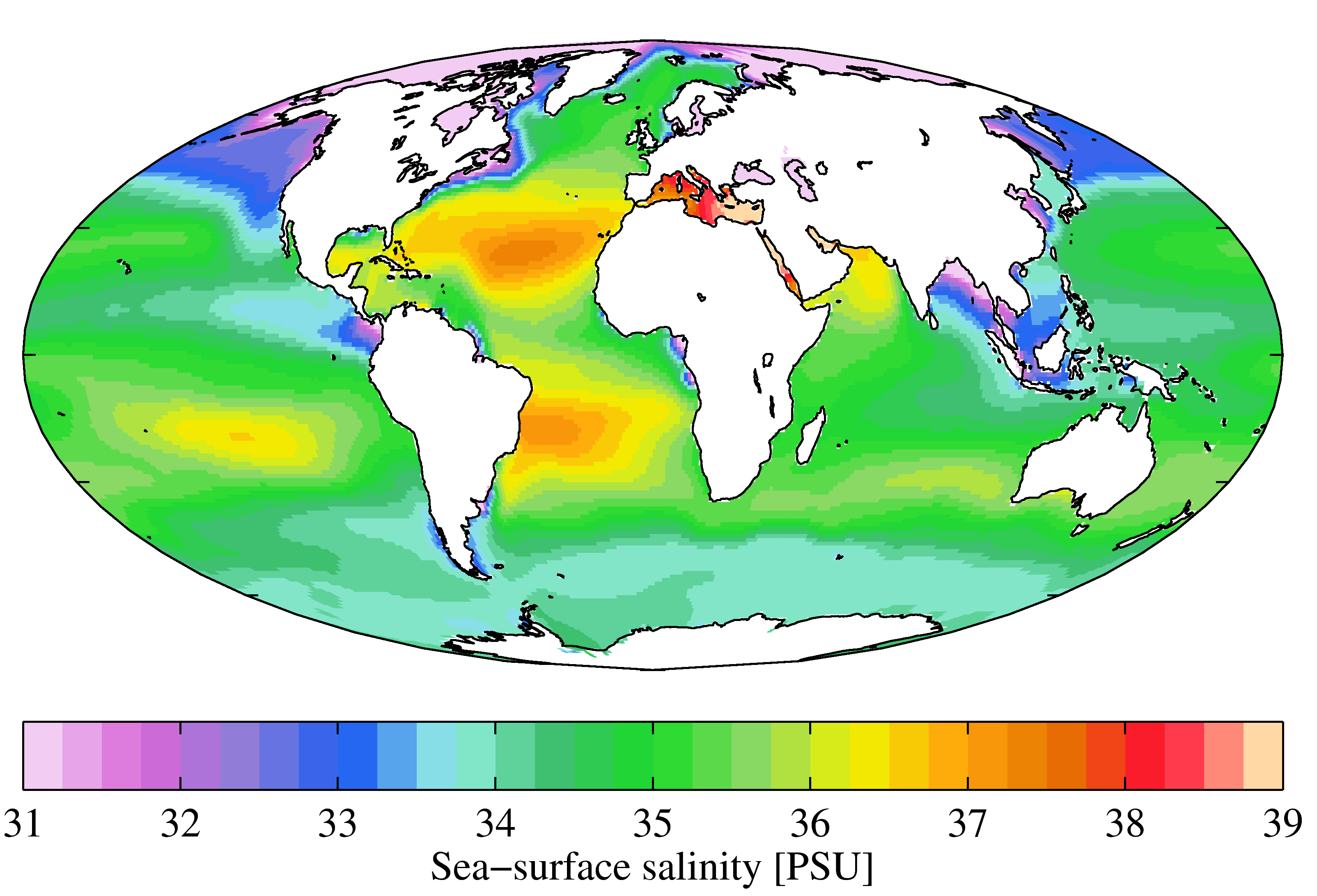
Annual mean sea surface salinity expressed in the Practical Salinity Scale for the World Ocean. Data from the World Ocean Atlas

Although the vast majority of seawater has a salinity of between 31 and 38 g/kg, that is 3.1–3.8%, seawater is not uniformly saline throughout the world. Where mixing occurs with freshwater runoff from river mouths, near melting glaciers or vast amounts of precipitation (e.g. monsoon), seawater can be substantially less saline. The most saline open sea is the Red Sea, where high rates of evaporation, low precipitation and low river run-off, and confined circulation result in unusually salty water. The salinity in isolated bodies of water can be considerably greater still – about ten times higher in the case of the Dead Sea. Historically, several salinity scales were used to approximate the absolute salinity of seawater. A popular scale was the "Practical Salinity Scale" where salinity was measured in "practical salinity units (PSU)". The current standard for salinity is the "Reference Salinity" scale with the salinity expressed in units of "g/kg".

=== Density ===
The density of surface seawater ranges from about 1020 to 1029 kg/m^{3}, depending on the temperature and salinity. At a temperature of 25 °C, the salinity of 35 g/kg and 1 atm pressure, the density of seawater is 1023.6 kg/m^{3}. Deep in the ocean, under high pressure, seawater can reach a density of 1050 kg/m^{3} or higher. The density of seawater also changes with salinity. Brines generated by seawater desalination plants can have salinities up to 120 g/kg. The density of typical seawater brine of 120 g/kg salinity at 25 °C and atmospheric pressure is 1088 kg/m^{3}.

=== pH value ===
The pH value at the surface of oceans in pre-industrial time (before 1850) was around 8.2. Since then, it has been decreasing due to a human-caused process called ocean acidification that is related to carbon dioxide emissions: Between 1950 and 2020, the average pH of the ocean surface fell from approximately 8.15 to 8.05.

The pH value of seawater is naturally as low as 7.8 in deep ocean waters as a result of the degradation of organic matter in these waters. It can be as high as 8.4 in surface waters in areas of high biological productivity.

Measurement of pH is complicated by the chemical properties of seawater, and several distinct pH scales exist in chemical oceanography. There is no universally accepted reference pH-scale for seawater and the difference between measurements based on different reference scales may be up to 0.14 units.

=== Chemical composition ===
Diagram showing concentrations of various salt ions in seawater. The composition of the total salt component is: Cl^{−} 55%, Na^{+} 30.6%, SO^{2−}_{4} 7.7%, Mg^{2+} 3.7%, Ca^{2+} 1.2%, K^{+} 1.1%, other 0.7%, by mass.

Seawater contains more dissolved ions than all types of freshwater. However, the ratios of solutes differ dramatically. For instance, although seawater contains about 2.8 times more bicarbonate than river water, the percentage of bicarbonate in seawater as a ratio of all dissolved ions is far lower than in river water. Bicarbonate ions constitute 48% of river water solutes but only 0.14% for seawater. Differences like these are due to the varying residence times of seawater solutes; sodium and chloride have very long residence times, while calcium (vital for carbonate formation) tends to precipitate much more quickly. The most abundant dissolved ions in seawater are sodium, chloride, magnesium, sulfate and calcium. Its osmolarity is about 1000 mOsm/L.

Small amounts of other substances are found, including amino acids at concentrations of up to 2 micrograms of nitrogen atoms per liter, which are thought to have played a key role in the origin of life.

Seawater elemental composition (salinity = 3.5%)
Element	Percent by mass
Oxygen	85.84
Hydrogen	10.82
Chlorine	1.94
Sodium	1.08
Magnesium	0.1292
Sulfur	0.091
Calcium	0.04
Potassium	0.04
Bromine	0.0067
Carbon	0.0028

Total molar composition of seawater (salinity = 35)
Component	Concentration (mol/kg)
H_{2}O	53.6
Cl^{−}	0.546
Na^{+}	0.469
Mg^{2+}	0.0528
SO^{2−}_{4}	0.0282
Ca^{2+}	0.0103
K^{+}	0.0102
C_{T}	0.00206
Br^{−}	0.000844
B_{T}	0.000416
Sr^{2+}	0.000091
F^{−}	0.000068

=== Microbial components ===
Research in 1957 by the Scripps Institution of Oceanography sampled water in both pelagic and neritic locations in the Pacific Ocean. Direct microscopic counts and cultures were used, the direct counts in some cases showing up to 10 000 times that obtained from cultures. These differences were attributed to the occurrence of bacteria in aggregates, selective effects of the culture media, and the presence of inactive cells. A marked reduction in bacterial culture numbers was noted below the thermocline, but not by direct microscopic observation. Large numbers of spirilli-like forms were seen by microscope but not under cultivation. The disparity in numbers obtained by the two methods is well known in this and other fields. In the 1990s, improved techniques of detection and identification of microbes by probing just small snippets of DNA, enabled researchers taking part in the Census of Marine Life to identify thousands of previously unknown microbes usually present only in small numbers. This revealed a far greater diversity than previously suspected, so that a litre of seawater may hold more than 20,000 species. Mitchell Sogin from the Marine Biological Laboratory feels that "the number of different kinds of bacteria in the oceans could eclipse five to 10 million."

Bacteria are found at all depths in the water column, as well as in the sediments, some being aerobic, others anaerobic. Most are free-swimming, but some exist as symbionts within other organisms – examples of these being bioluminescent bacteria. Cyanobacteria played an important role in the evolution of ocean processes, enabling the development of stromatolites and oxygen in the atmosphere.

Some bacteria interact with diatoms, and form a critical link in the cycling of silicon in the ocean. One anaerobic species, Thiomargarita namibiensis, plays an important part in the breakdown of hydrogen sulfide eruptions from diatomaceous sediments off the Namibian coast, and generated by high rates of phytoplankton growth in the Benguela Current upwelling zone, eventually falling to the seafloor.

Bacteria-like Archaea surprised marine microbiologists by their survival and thriving in extreme environments, such as the hydrothermal vents on the ocean floor. Alkalotolerant marine bacteria such as Pseudomonas and Vibrio spp. survive in a pH range of 7.3 to 10.6, while some species will grow only at pH 10 to 10.6. Archaea also exist in pelagic waters and may constitute as much as half the ocean's biomass, clearly playing an important part in oceanic processes. In 2000 sediments from the ocean floor revealed a species of Archaea that breaks down methane, an important greenhouse gas and a major contributor to atmospheric warming. Some bacteria break down the rocks of the sea floor, influencing seawater chemistry. Oil spills, and runoff containing human sewage and chemical pollutants have a marked effect on microbial life in the vicinity, as well as harbouring pathogens and toxins affecting all forms of marine life. The protist dinoflagellates may at certain times undergo population explosions called blooms or red tides, often after human-caused pollution. The process may produce metabolites known as biotoxins, which move along the ocean food chain, tainting higher-order animal consumers.

Pandoravirus salinus, a species of very large virus, with a genome much larger than that of any other virus species, was discovered in 2013. Like the other very large viruses Mimivirus and Megavirus, Pandoravirus infects amoebas, but its genome, containing 1.9 to 2.5 megabases of DNA, is twice as large as that of Megavirus, and it differs greatly from the other large viruses in appearance and in genome structure.

In 2013, researchers from Aberdeen University announced that they were starting a hunt for undiscovered chemicals in organisms that have evolved in deep sea trenches, hoping to find "the next generation" of antibiotics, anticipating an "antibiotic apocalypse" with a dearth of new infection-fighting drugs. The EU-funded research will start in the Atacama Trench and then move on to search trenches off New Zealand and Antarctica.

The ocean has a long history of human waste disposal on the assumption that its vast size makes it capable of absorbing and diluting all noxious material. While this may be true on a small scale, the large amounts of sewage routinely dumped has damaged many coastal ecosystems, and rendered them life-threatening. Pathogenic viruses and bacteria occur in such waters, such as Escherichia coli, Vibrio cholerae the cause of cholera, hepatitis A, hepatitis E and polio, along with protozoans causing giardiasis and cryptosporidiosis. These pathogens are routinely present in the ballast water of large vessels, and are widely spread when the ballast is discharged.

=== Other parameters ===
The speed of sound in seawater is about 1,500 m/s (whereas the speed of sound is usually around 330 m/s in air at roughly 101.3 kPa pressure, 1 atmosphere), and varies with water temperature, salinity, and pressure. The thermal conductivity of seawater is 0.6 W/mK at 25 °C and a salinity of 35 g/kg. The thermal conductivity decreases with increasing salinity and increases with increasing temperature.

== Origin and history ==
The water in the sea was thought to come from the Earth's volcanoes, starting 4 billion years ago, released by degassing from molten rock. More recent work suggests much of the Earth's water may come from comets.

Scientific theories behind the origins of sea salt started with Sir Edmond Halley in 1715, who proposed that salt and other minerals were carried into the sea by rivers after rainfall washed it out of the ground. Upon reaching the ocean, these salts concentrated as more salt arrived over time (see Hydrologic cycle). Halley noted that most lakes that do not have ocean outlets (such as the Dead Sea and the Caspian Sea, see endorheic basin), have high salt content. Halley termed this process "continental weathering".

Halley's theory was partly correct. In addition, sodium leached out of the ocean floor when the ocean formed. The presence of salt's other dominant ion, chloride, results from outgassing of chloride (as hydrochloric acid) with other gases from Earth's interior via volcanos and hydrothermal vents. The sodium and chloride ions subsequently became the most abundant constituents of sea salt.

Ocean salinity has been stable for billions of years, most likely as a consequence of a chemical/tectonic system which removes as much salt as is deposited; for instance, sodium and chloride sinks include evaporite deposits, pore-water burial, and reactions with seafloor basalts.

== Human impacts ==
Climate change, rising levels of carbon dioxide in Earth's atmosphere, excess nutrients, and pollution in many forms are altering global oceanic geochemistry. Rates of change for some aspects greatly exceed those in the historical and recent geological record. Major trends include an increasing acidity, reduced subsurface oxygen in both near-shore and pelagic waters, rising coastal nitrogen levels, and widespread increases in mercury and persistent organic pollutants. Most of these perturbations are tied either directly or indirectly to human fossil fuel combustion, fertilizer, and industrial activity. Concentrations are projected to grow in coming decades, with negative impacts on ocean biota and other marine resources.

One of the most striking features of this is ocean acidification, resulting from increased CO_{2} uptake of the oceans related to higher atmospheric concentration of CO_{2} and higher temperatures, because it severely affects coral reefs, mollusks, echinoderms and crustaceans (see coral bleaching).

Seawater is a means of transportation throughout the world. Every day plenty of ships cross the ocean to deliver goods to various locations around the world. Seawater is a tool for countries to efficiently participate in international commercial trade and transportation, but each ship exhausts emissions that can harm marine life, air quality of coastal areas. Seawater transportation is one of the fastest growing human generated greenhouse gas emissions. The emissions released from ships pose significant risks to human health in nearing areas as the oil and gas released from the operation of merchant ships decreases the air quality and causes more pollution both in the seawater and surrounding areas.

Another human use of seawater that has been considered is the use of seawater for agricultural purposes. In areas with higher regions of sand dunes, such as Israel, the use of seawater for irrigation of plants would eliminate substantial costs associated with fresh water when it is not easily accessible. Although it is not typical to use salt water as a means to grow plants as the salt gathers and ruins the surrounding soil, it has been proven to be successful in sand and gravel soils. Large-scale desalination of seawater is another factor that would contribute to the success of agriculture farming in dry, desert environments. One of the most successful plants in salt water agriculture is the halophyte. The halophyte is a salt tolerant plant whose cells are resistant to the typically detrimental effects of salt in soil. The endodermis forces a higher level of salt filtration throughout the plant as it allows for the circulation of more water through the cells. The cultivation of halophytes irrigated with salt water were used to grow animal feed for livestock; however, the animals that were fed these plants consumed more water than those that did not. Although agriculture from use of saltwater is still not recognized and used on a large scale, initial research has shown that there could be an opportunity to provide more crops in regions where agricultural farming is not usually feasible.

== Human consumption ==
Accidentally consuming small quantities of clean seawater is not harmful, especially if the seawater is taken along with a larger quantity of fresh water. However, drinking seawater to maintain hydration is counterproductive; more water must be excreted to eliminate the salt (via urine) than the amount of water obtained from the seawater itself. In normal circumstances, it would be considered ill-advised to consume large amounts of unfiltered seawater. In pre-colonial Tahiti, minimal amount of seawater was an ingredient for fresh sauces (miti) namely miti hue (with fermented coconut) and miti haʻari (mixed with coconut milk) as main condiments seasonings meals, unlike related peoples like Hawaiians who developed salt winning independently thus procuring dry salts for their own use.

The renal system actively regulates the levels of sodium and chloride in the blood within a very narrow range around 9 g/L (0.9% by mass).

In most open waters, concentrations vary somewhat around typical values of about 3.5%, far higher than the body can tolerate and most beyond what the kidney can process. A point frequently overlooked in claims that the kidney can excrete NaCl in Baltic concentrations of 2% (in arguments to the contrary) is that the gut cannot absorb water at such concentrations, so that there is no benefit in drinking such water. The salinity of Baltic surface water, however, is never 2%; it is 0.9% or less, and thus never higher than that of bodily fluids. Drinking seawater temporarily increases blood's NaCl concentration. This signals the kidney to excrete sodium, but seawater's sodium concentration is above the kidney's maximum concentrating ability. Eventually, the blood's sodium concentration rises to toxic levels, removing water from cells and interfering with nerve conduction, ultimately producing fatal seizure and cardiac arrhythmia.

Survival manuals consistently advise against drinking seawater. A summary of 163 life raft voyages estimated the risk of death at 39% for those who drank seawater, compared to 3% for those who did not. The effect of seawater intake on rats confirmed the negative effects of drinking seawater when dehydrated.

The temptation to drink seawater was greatest for sailors who had expended their supply of fresh water and were unable to capture enough rainwater for drinking. This frustration was described famously by a line from Samuel Taylor Coleridge's The Rime of the Ancient Mariner:

Water, water, everywhere,
And all the boards did shrink;
Water, water, everywhere,
Nor any drop to drink.

Although humans cannot survive on seawater in place of normal drinking water, some people claim that up to two cups a day, mixed with fresh water in a 2:3 ratio, produces no ill effect. The French physician Alain Bombard survived an ocean crossing in a small Zodiak rubber boat using mainly raw fish meat, which contains about 40% water (like most living tissues), as well as small amounts of seawater and other provisions harvested from the ocean. His findings were challenged, but an alternative explanation could not be given. In his 1948 book The Kon-Tiki Expedition, Thor Heyerdahl reported drinking seawater mixed with fresh in a 2:3 ratio during the 1947 expedition. A few years later, another adventurer, William Willis, claimed to have drunk two cups of seawater and one cup of fresh per day for 70 days without ill effect when he lost part of his water supply.

During the 18th century, Richard Russell advocated the medical use of this practice in the UK, and René Quinton expanded the advocation of this practice to other countries, notably France, in the 20th century. Currently, it is widely practiced in Nicaragua and other countries, supposedly taking advantage of the latest medical discoveries.

=== Purification ===
Like any other type of raw or contaminated water, seawater can be evaporated or filtered to eliminate salt, germs, and other contaminants that would otherwise prevent it from being considered potable. Most oceangoing vessels desalinate potable water from seawater using processes such as vacuum distillation or multi-stage flash distillation in an evaporator, or, more recently, reverse osmosis. These energy-intensive processes were not usually available during the Age of Sail. Larger sailing warships with large crews, such as Nelson's HMS Victory, were fitted with distilling apparatus in their galleys. The natural sea salt obtained by evaporating seawater can also be collected and sold as table salt, typically sold separately owing to its unique mineral make-up compared to rock salt or other sources.

A number of regional cuisines across the world traditionally incorporate seawater directly as an ingredient, cooking other ingredients in a diluted solution of filtered seawater as a substitute for conventional dry seasonings. Proponents include world-renowned chefs Ferran Adrià and Quique Dacosta, whose home country of Spain has six different companies sourcing filtered seawater for culinary use. The water is marketed as la sal perfecta, "the perfect salt", containing less sodium with what is considered a superior taste. A restaurant run by Joaquín Baeza sources as much as 60,000 litres a month from supplier Mediterranea

Animals such as fish, whales, sea turtles, and seabirds, such as penguins and albatrosses, have adapted to living in a high-saline habitat. For example, sea turtles and saltwater crocodiles remove excess salt from their bodies through their tear ducts.

== Mineral extraction ==
Minerals have been extracted from seawater since ancient times. Currently the four most concentrated metals – Na, Mg, Ca and K – are commercially extracted from seawater. During 2015 in the US 63% of magnesium production came from seawater and brines. Bromine is also produced from seawater in China and Japan. Lithium extraction from seawater was tried in the 1970s, but the tests were soon abandoned. The idea of extracting uranium from seawater has been considered at least from the 1960s, but only a few grams of uranium were extracted in Japan in the late 1990s. The main issue is not one of technological feasibility but that current prices on the uranium market for uranium from other sources are about three to five times lower than the lowest price achieved by seawater extraction. Similar issues hamper the use of reprocessed uranium and are often brought forth against nuclear reprocessing and the manufacturing of MOX fuel as economically unviable.

=== The future of mineral and element extractions ===
In order for seawater mineral and element extractions to take place while taking close consideration of sustainable practices, it is necessary for monitored management systems to be put in place. This requires management of ocean areas and their conditions, environmental planning, structured guidelines to ensure that extractions are controlled, regular assessments of the condition of the sea post-extraction, and constant monitoring. The use of technology, such as underwater drones, can facilitate sustainable extractions. The use of low-carbon infrastructure would also allow for more sustainable extraction processes while reducing the carbon footprint from mineral extractions.

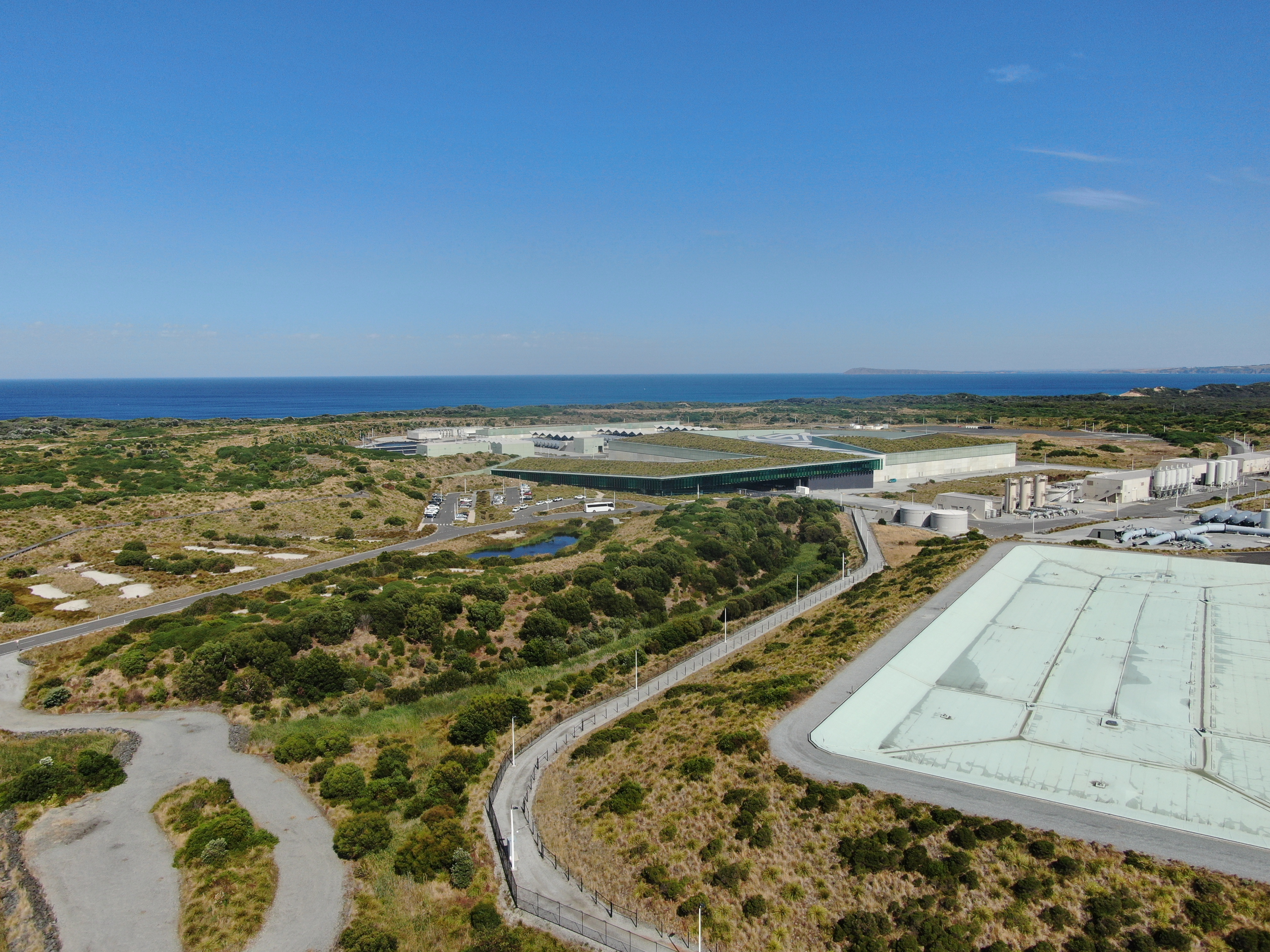
Desalination plant

Another practice that is being considered closely is the process of desalination in order to achieve a more sustainable water supply from seawater. Although desalination also comes with environmental concerns, such as costs and resources, researchers are working closely to determine more sustainable practices, such as creating more productive water plants that can deal with larger water supplies in areas where these plans weren't always available. Although seawater extractions can benefit society greatly, it is crucial to consider the environmental impact and to ensure that all extractions are conducted in a way that acknowledges and considers the associated risks to the sustainability of seawater ecosystems.

=== Standard ===
ASTM International has an international standard for artificial seawater: ASTM D1141-98 (Original Standard ASTM D1141-52). It is used in a variety of research testing labs as a reproducible solution for seawater such as tests on corrosion, oil contamination, and detergency evaluation.

=== Ecosystems ===
The minerals found in seawater can also play an important role in the food cycle of marine ecosystems. For example, the Southern Ocean contributes greatly to the environmental carbon cycle, and the deficiency of high levels of iron impacts marine life. As a result, this ocean is not able to produce as much phytoplankton, including diatoms which is the primary food source of Antarctic krill, hindering the first source of the marine food chain. As the cycle continues, larger sea animals like blue whale and fin whale feed off of Antarctic krill, but they also lack iron due to shortage of iron from the initial phytoplankton. These whales not only rely on iron for a balance of minerals within their diet, but it also impacts the amount of iron that is regenerated back into the ocean. Their excretions also contain the absorbed iron which would allow iron to be reinserted into the ocean's ecosystem. Overall, one mineral deficiency such as iron in the Southern Ocean can spark a significant chain of disturbances within the marine ecosystems which demonstrates the important role that seawater plays in the food chain.

Upon further analysis of the dynamic relationship between diatoms, krill, and baleen whales, fecal samples of baleen whales were examined in Antarctic seawater. The findings included that iron concentrations were 10 million times higher than those found in Antarctic seawater, and krill was found consistently throughout their feces which is an indicator that krill is in whale diets. Antarctic krill had an average iron level of 174.3mg/kg dry weight, but the iron in the krill varied from 12 to 174 mg/kg dry weight. The average iron concentration of the muscular tissue of blue whales and fin whales was 173 mg/kg dry weight, which demonstrates that the large marine mammals are important to marine ecosystems such as they are to the Southern Ocean. In fact, to have more whales in the ocean could heighten the amount of iron in seawater through their excretions which would promote a better ecosystem.

Krill and baleen whales act as large iron reservoirs in seawater in the Southern Ocean. Krill can retain up to 24% of iron found on surface waters within its range.The process of krill feeding on diatoms releases iron into seawater, highlighting them as an important part of the ocean's iron cycle. The advantageous relationship between krill and baleen whales increases the amount of iron that can be recycled and stored in seawater. A positive feedback loop is created, increasing the overall productivity of marine life in the Southern Ocean.

Organisms of all sizes play a significant role in the balance of marine ecosystems with both the largest and smallest inhabitants contributing equally to recycling nutrients in seawater. Prioritizing the recovery of whale populations because they boost the overall productivity in marine ecosystems as well as increasing iron levels in seawater would allow for a balanced and productive system for the ocean. However, a more in depth study is required to understand the benefits of whale feces as a fertilizer and to provide further insight in iron recycling in the Southern Ocean. Projects on the management of ecosystems and conservation are vital for advancing knowledge of marine ecology.

=== Environmental impact and sustainability ===
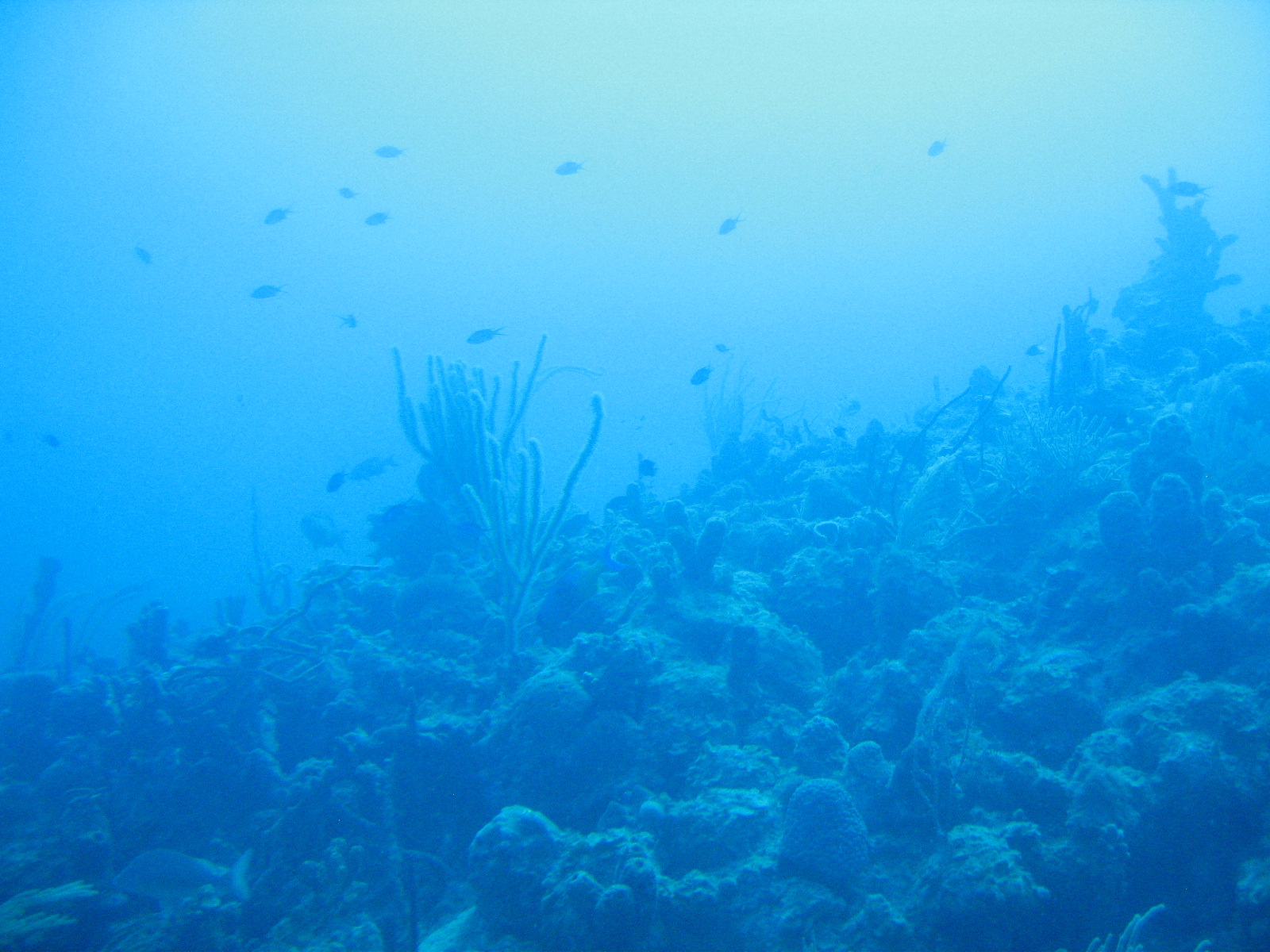
Marine life flourishing on the seafloor

Like any mineral extraction practices, there are environmental advantages and disadvantages. Metals like cobalt and lithium can be used for aiding with more sustainable technologies above ground, such as powering batteries for electric vehicles or creating wind power. Lithium mining from the seafloor at mass quantities could provide a substantial amount of renewable metals to promote more sustainable practices in society to reduce humans' carbon footprint. The success of lithium mining is dependent on more productive recycling practices above ground.

There are also risks that come with extracting from the seafloor. Many species have long lifespans on the seafloor, which means that their reproduction takes more time. Similarly to fish harvesting from the seafloor, the extraction of minerals in large amounts, too quickly, without proper protocols, can result in a disruption of the underwater ecosystems. Contrarily, this would have the opposite effect and prevent mineral extractions from being a long-term sustainable practice, and would result in a shortage of required metals. Any seawater mineral extractions also risk disrupting the habitat of the underwater life that is dependent on the uninterrupted ecosystem within their environment as disturbances can have significant disturbances on animal communities.

== See also ==
- Artificial seawater – Mixture of dissolved salts simulating the mean seawater composition
- Brackish water – Water with salinity between freshwater and seawater
- Brine – Concentrated solution of salt in water
- Brine mining – Extracting materials from saltwater
- CORA dataset – Oceanographic temperature and salinity dataset global ocean salinity
- Fresh water – Naturally occurring water with low amounts of dissolved salts
- Ocean color
- Saline water – Water that contains a high concentration of dissolved salts
- Sea ice – Outcome of seawater as it freezes
- Seawater pH – Measure of the level of acidity or basicity of an aqueous solution
- Surface tension of seawater – Tendency of a liquid surface to shrink to reduce surface area
- Thalassotherapy – Form of therapy using seawater
- Thermohaline circulation – Part of large-scale ocean circulation
