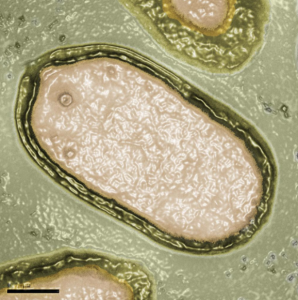
- Pandoravirus salinus under microscope

Virus classification
- (unranked): Virus
- Realm: Varidnaviria
- Kingdom: Bamfordvirae
- Phylum: Nucleocytoviricota
- Class: Megaviricetes
- Order: Algavirales (?)
- Family: Pandoraviridae
- Genus: Pandoravirus
- Species: Pandoravirus salinus

= Pandoravirus salinus =

Species of virus

Pandoravirus salinus is a large virus of genus Pandoravirus, found in the marine sediment layer of the Tunquen River in Chile, and is one of the largest viruses identified, along with Pandoravirus dulcis. It is 2.5 million nucleobases long, encodes for about 2,500 genes, and is visible through an optical microscope. It was first identified in 2013.
