= Total boron =

Sum of boron species in a solution

The total boron (B_{T}) is the sum of boron species in a solution. In the environment these species usually include boric acid and borate, for example:

B_{T} = [H_{2}BO^{−}_{3}] + [H_{3}BO_{3}]

where

- B_{T} is the total boron concentration
- [H_{2}BO^{−}_{3}] is the dihydrogen borate concentration
- [H_{3}BO_{3}] is the boric acid concentration.

In the early 21st Century, new methods of assessing and measuring the total boron were developed.

== Importance ==
Total boron is an important quantity when determining alkalinity due to borate's contribution to a solution's acid neutraling capacity. Total boron is a conservative element in seawater, and can thus be calculated by simply knowing the salinity.

Total boron is also important for agriculture, since water soluble or "mobile" boron is an essential micronutrient, which means it is essential for plant growth and development, but is required in very small quantities. Although Boron requirements vary among crops, the optimum boron content of the leaves for most crops is 20-100 ppm. Without enough Boron, plants develop Boron deficiency, which can destroy crops and thus lead to famine.

Boron is often used as a fertilizer in the form of Borax; however plants can't absorb the insoluble form of the boron in tourmaline.

Another reason why total boron is important is toxicity. While present in measurable quantities in all plants, excess total amounts harms the environment, including plants that cannot cope with the excess boron. Too much boric acid can be toxic, as can certain other boron compounds, to mammals, including humans, fish, and birds.

== See also ==
- Total organic carbon
- Total Alkalinity(A_{T})
- pH
