= Chlamydia (disambiguation) =

Chlamydia is a sexually transmitted infection caused by the bacterium Chlamydia trachomatis.

Chlamydia may also refer to:

- Chlamydia (bacterium), a genus of pathogenic bacteria
  - Chlamydia abortus, a chlamydial species that causes abortion in mammals
  - Chlamydia caviae, a chlamydial species found in Guinea pigs
  - Chlamydia felis, a chlamydial species found in cats
  - Chlamydia muridarum, causing disease in mice and hamsters (the Muridae)
  - Chlamydia pecorum, a chlamydial species common in livestock
  - Chlamydia pneumoniae, also known as Chlamydophila pneumoniae, an airborne chlamydial species responsible for human respiratory infection and numerous animal infections
  - Chlamydia psittaci, causes parrot fever
  - Chlamydia suis, infects pigs (Sus scrofa)
  - Chlamydia trachomatis, causing human sexually transmitted disease and eye infections
