= Chlamydia felis =

Scientific classification
- Domain: Bacteria
- Kingdom: Pseudomonadati
- Phylum: Chlamydiota
- Class: Chlamydiia
- Order: Chlamydiales
- Family: Chlamydiaceae
- Genus: Chlamydia
- Species: C. felis

Binomial name
- Chlamydia felis (Everett et al. 1999) Sachse et al. 2015

Synonyms
- Chlamydophila felis Everett et al., 1999; Chlamydia psittaci var. felis

Species of bacterium

Chlamydia felis is a Gram-negative, obligate intracellular bacterial pathogen that infects cats. It is endemic among domestic cats worldwide, primarily causing inflammation of feline conjunctiva, rhinitis and respiratory problems. C. felis can be recovered from the stomach and reproductive tract. Zoonotic infection of humans with C. felis has been reported. Strains FP Pring and FP Cello have an extrachromosomal plasmid, whereas the FP Baker strain does not. FP Cello produces lethal disease in mice, whereas the FP Baker does not. An attenuated FP Baker strain, and an attenuated 905 strain, are used as live vaccines for cats.

== Taxonomy and phylogeny ==
The genus Chlamydia contains the species C. trachomatis, C. psittaci, C. abortus, C. felis, C. muridarum, C. suis, C. caviae, C. pecorum, and C. pneumoniae. However, there is some dispute that some of these species, including C. felis, should be classified in a separate genus, Chlamydophila, but this has not been widely accepted. C. felis is closely related to C. pneumoniae (causes pneumonia in humans), C. trachomatis (causes Chlamydia in humans), and C. muridarum (causes pneumonia in mice). C. pneumoniae shares 879 orthologs, genes that come from a common ancestor, with C. felis while C. trachomatis and C. muridarium both share 841 orthologs with C.felis. All Chlamydia species are Gram-negative, obligate intracellular pathogens with two distinct life stages (see Characterization) that are able to infect a wide range of mammals and birds around the world.

== Discovery ==
In 1942, James A. Baker described a pathogen that causes atypical pneumonia in cats, mice, and apparently humans. Back then it was not known that Chlamydia are bacteria, and indeed Baker did not even use the term Chlamydia. Baker started researching this pathogen due to the number of atypical pneumonia cases observed in cats and later discovered that the atypical human pneumonia cases coincided with feline cases. Cats infected with this atypical pneumonia were recognized by their symptoms of sneezing, coughing, and ocular and nasal discharge. The disease was characterized by its highly infectious nature and long infection time. To determine what the causative agent was, Baker made a suspension of the infected cat lungs and used the suspension to infect mice via their nasal passage. The infected specimens died 2–5 days after initial infection. After autopsy of the deceased specimens, Baker confirmed that they died from the same disease from the condition of the lungs of the mice. He could not culture the pathogen using the available culturing methods of the time, so for a while thought that the causative agent might be a virus. Baker did find the causative agent when he spun the infected mouse lungs in a centrifuge. He found the elementary bodies (see § Characterization) of the pathogen that had been separated from the mouse lungs, confirming that they were the causative agent of the disease.

Possibly the same organism was called Miyagawanella felis in the 7th edition of Bergey's Manual (1957), Rickettsiaformis felis in Zhdanov 1953, and Chlamydozoon felis in Ryzhkov 1950. When the combination name Chlamydia psittaci was first published in 1968, all these were considered synonyms and thus subsumed into C. psittaci.

In 1969 the pathogen was again reported to be zoonotic.

In 1999, Everett et al. split out Chlamydophila felis from C. psittaci. This is the first time for this pathogen to be an independent species since the nomenclatural starting-point of the Prokaryotic Code in 1980.

== Characterization ==
C. felis is a Gram negative (also known as diderm), microaerophilic bacterium, whose cell wall seems to lack peptidoglycan. Its morphology is that of a coccobacillus. C. felis is also an obligate intracellular pathogen that infects eukaryotic cells, specifically cats, but has zoonotic potential. The bacterium like many in its phylum, has evolved to have two distinct life stages: the elementary body (EB) and the reticulate body (RB). The EB is the infectious phase of the pathogen and is characterized by reduced metabolic activity and the inability to replicate. The exact morphology of the EB varies among species within the Chlamydiota phylum. The RB is the replicative phase of the pathogen's life cycle and has a higher metabolic activity compared to the EB. When the extracellular phase (EB) infects the host eukaryotic cell via endocytosis the bacteria transforms into the replicative phase (RB) while remaining in a membrane-bound vesicle called an inclusion. Within the inclusion the RB cells will avoid the host cell's defenses, such as lysosomes, grow, and divide by binary fission. This method of infection and replication is common among the Chlamydia genus. It is currently unknown how the bacteria receive their nutrients from the host while residing in the inclusion.

=== Metabolism ===
Many metabolic processes and genes are highly conserved among Chlamydia. Due to C. felis's, and Chlamydia in general, small genome, it is missing the genes for several essential enzymes for metabolic pathways, such as glycolysis and the citric acid cycle. It cannot synthesize nucleotides, nor many cofactors or amino acids. However, the bacteria's ability to synthesize and/or scavenge amino acids and nucleotides varies from species-to-species and from strain-to-strain, as shown by C. felis's ability to synthesize the tryptophan. In order to survive, C. felis will take various metabolites, such as phosphorylated sugars, and other essential molecules from the host cell. It is currently unknown exactly how the bacteria receive these molecules while residing in the inclusion. It is thought that the bacteria receive host lipids by intercepting vesicles departing from the Golgi apparatus and by stealing lipid droplets and host lipid transfer proteins. With the nutrients gathered from the host cell, the bacteria can perform glycolysis and the citric acid cycle. The bacteria also have a fully functional electron transport chain (ETC), which includes a Na^{+} translocating NADH dehydrogenase, cytochrome bd oxidase, and a V-type ATPase. C. felis uses oxygen as its terminal electron acceptor, in which the cytochrome bd oxidase is necessary. The presence of a Na^{+} translocating NADH dehydrogenase suggests that instead of a proton-motive force, the bacteria uses a sodium-motive force for creating an electrochemical gradient across the plasma membrane. C. felis has also been shown to have a complete pentose phosphate pathway (PPP) and gluconeogenesis pathway, as well as being capable of both creating and degrading glycogen.

=== Genome ===
A bacterial culture was obtained by inoculating fertilized chicken eggs with C. felis. After the strain had gone through several chicken egg passages, the strain went through four passages of McCoy cells before finally being used for genetic analysis. The genome of C. felis was sequenced via whole genome shotgun. Each gene was then annotated by programs BLASTP and FASTA. Programs GenomeGambler, GeneHacker plus, and Glimmer 2.0 were used to predict protein-coding genes. To search from transmembrane proteins, the program SOSUI was used, and tRNAscan-SE for tRNA genes. C. felis has one circular chromosome that consists of around 1,100,00 base pairs. Compared to non-pathogenic organisms, the size of the C. felis is relatively small. The genes that C. felis does possess encode over 1,000 proteins. Many of the genes are highly conserved within the Chlamydia genus.

A specific plasmid is also highly conserved among Chlamydia. The plasmid C. felis possess is called pCfe1 and is about 7,500 base pairs long. A recent study has suggested that the plasmid is necessary for pathogenicity, though the exact mechanism is currently unknown.

=== Ecology ===
C. felis was originally discovered in the lungs of cats suffering from pneumonia. C. felis used to be considered a strain of another member of its genus, C. psittaci until it was recognized as a separate species and reclassified as Chlamydophila felis. Chlamydophila felis was then reclassified to Chlamydia felis due to dispute on the taxonomic usage of Chlamydophila, which is still disputed to this day. C. felis is found worldwide. It has been reported to infect humans as well, giving it zoonotic potential, though it is rare. Humans that are infected can suffer from conjunctivitis and/or respiratory problems. As typical of many members of its genus, C. felis is well adapted to live within its host and cannot survive for long outside of the host. Thus, direct contact is necessary for the pathogen to spread and is why C. felis infection is more common in multi-cat environments.

==== Disease ====
Infected cats typically contract conjunctivitis within a 2-5 day incubation period. Clinical signs of infection are hyperaemia of the nictitating membrane (severity varies), blepharospasm, and discharge from the eye. The infection is not deadly, but if left untreated may cause blindness and pain for the cat. Infection is commonly spread among cats by ocular secretion. C. felis infection is most common in multicat environments such as shelters, breeder catteries, and among stray cat communities. Young cats, around the age of one year or under, are at the highest risk of infection. Infection can be detected either by culturing a sample or by PCR. Ocular samples are the most common, but samples can also be oropharyngeal, nasal, and/or oral. The infection can be treated with antibiotics, typically with tetracyclines. Vaccines for C. felis, both attenuated and inactivated, are available for cats. For immunocompromised cats it is recommended that they only receive the inactivated vaccine, and only if necessary.

== Significance ==
=== Zoonotic potential ===
C. felis typically has low zoonotic potential, which is the likelihood that a pathogen can be spread from animal to human and still cause disease. People who own or handle cats regularly are at a higher risk of contracting an infection from an afflicted cat. The risk is even higher if the individual is immunocompromised or if there is poor hygiene. In humans, C. felis could cause conjunctivitis, various respiratory problems, and other diseases. Since most human cases are asymptomatic, it is possible that this zoonosis occurs more often than we know.

=== Cat health ===
C. felis is a common cause of conjunctivitis and upper respiratory problems in cats. If left untreated, it leads to damage in the eyes followed by a loss of vision and, eventually, blindness. While this is not fatal, it is still very uncomfortable for the cat. Many countries do have a vaccine available.

=== Adoption ===
Up to 95% of cats with this infection come from shelters that have poor hygiene practices. The presence of other animals, like in an animal shelter, increases prevalence. This could have an impact on the adoption rates of animals in infected shelters. People generally prefer cats that appear happy, healthy, and playful. However, some cats are adopted out of pity.

=== Economic impact ===
C. felis has been isolated from up to 30% of cats with conjunctivitis or upper respiratory tract disease. Doxycyline is an antibiotic that is commonly used to treat these infections at a dosage of 10 mg/kg of body weight daily for four weeks. One 100 mg capsule can cost anywhere from $0.61 to US$13.26. This cost of treatment can be financially limiting considering that all cats within a facility, shelter, or home must be treated regardless of whether they are infected to ensure the disease is effectively eradicated.

== See also ==
- Feline vaccination
