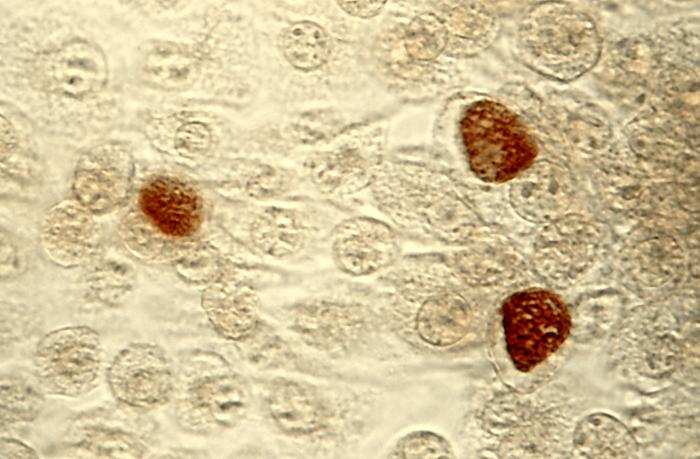
- Chlamydia trachomatis inclusions (brown) within host cells

Scientific classification
- Domain: Bacteria
- Kingdom: Pseudomonadati
- Phylum: Chlamydiota
- Class: Chlamydiia
- Order: Chlamydiales
- Family: Chlamydiaceae
- Genus: Chlamydia
- Species: C. trachomatis

Binomial name
- Chlamydia trachomatis (Busacca 1935) Rake 1957 emend. Everett et al. 1999

Synonyms
- Rickettsia trachomae [sic] Busacca 1935; Rickettsia trachomatis (Busacca 1935) Foley and Parrot 1937; Chlamydozoon trachomatis (Busacca 1935) Moshkovski 1945

= Chlamydia trachomatis =

Chlamydia trachomatis (/kləˈmɪdiə trəˈkoʊmətɪs/) is a Gram-negative, facultative anaerobic bacterium responsible for chlamydia and trachoma. C. trachomatis exists in two forms, an extracellular infectious elementary body (EB) and an intracellular non-infectious reticulate body (RB). The EB attaches to host cells and enters the cell using effector proteins, where it transforms into the metabolically active RB. Inside the cell, RBs rapidly replicate before transitioning back to EBs, which are then released to infect new host cells.

The earliest description of C. trachomatis was in 1907 by Stanislaus von Prowazek and Ludwig Halberstädter as a protozoan. It was later thought to be a virus due to its small size and inability to grow in laboratories. It was not until 1966 when it was discovered as a bacterium by electron microscopy after its internal structures were visually observed.

There are currently 19 serovars of C. trachomatis, each associated with specific diseases affecting mucosal cells in genital tracts and ocular systems. Infections are often asymptomatic, but can lead to severe complications such as pelvic inflammatory disease in women and epididymitis in men. The bacterium also causes urethritis, conjunctivitis, and lymphogranuloma venereum in both sexes. C. trachomatis genitourinary infections are more common among young populations. In 2020, the World Health Organization (WHO) estimated 128.5 million new infections occurred worldwide among people aged 15-49. Exposure to this bacterium during birth can cause infants to develop pneumonia, typically around 1-3 months of age. Trachoma, an eye disease caused by C. trachomatis, is the leading infectious cause of blindness worldwide. The WHO estimates that around 1.9 million people are currently facing blindness or visual impairment due to trachoma.

The impact of C. trachomatis on human health has been driving vaccine research since its discovery. Currently, no vaccines are available, largely due to the complexity of the immunological pathways involved in C. trachomatis, which remain poorly understood. However, C. trachomatis infections may be treated with several antibiotics, but doxycycline is the preferred option.

== Classification ==
Chlamydia trachomatis are bacteria in the genus Chlamydia, a group of obligate intracellular parasites of eukaryotic cells. Although Chlamydia trachomatis cells heavily rely on their host cells for nutrients, its elementary bodies and reticulate bodies can perform metabolic tasks under the correct conditions.

Chlamydia trachomatis strains are generally divided into three biovars based on the type of human disease they cause. Each biovar is further subdivided into several serovars based on the surface antigens recognized by the immune system. Serovars A through C cause trachoma, which is the world's leading cause of preventable infectious blindness. Serovars D through K infect the genital tract, causing pelvic inflammatory disease, ectopic pregnancies, and infertility. Serovars L1 through L3 cause an invasive infection of the lymph nodes near the genitals, called lymphogranuloma venereum.

Chlamydia trachomatis is thought to have diverged from other Chlamydia species around 6 million years ago. This genus contains a total of nine species: C. trachomatis, C. muridarum, C. pneumoniae, C. pecorum, C. suis, C. abortus, C. felis, C. caviae, and C. psittaci. The closest relative to C. trachomatis is C. muridarum, which infects mice. C. muridarum was formerly known as the "mouse pneumonitis" (MoPn) biovar of C. trachomatis. C. trachomatis along with C. pneumoniae have been found to infect humans to a greater extent. C. trachomatis exclusively infects humans. C. pneumoniae is found to also infect horses, marsupials, and frogs. Some of the other species can have a considerable impact on human health due to their known zoonotic transmission.

== Cell structure and genome ==
Chlamydia trachomatis is a gram-negative bacterium that replicates exclusively within a host cell, making it an obligate intracellular pathogen. Over the course of its life cycle, C. trachomatis takes on two distinct forms to facilitate infection and replication. Elementary bodies (EBs) are 200 to 400 nanometers across and are surrounded by a rigid cell wall that enables them to survive in an extracellular form. When an EB encounters a susceptible host cell, it binds to the cell surface and is internalized. The second form, reticulate bodies (RBs), are 600 to 1500 nanometers across, and are found only within host cells. RBs have increased metabolic activity and are adapted for replication. Neither form is motile.

The evolution of C. trachomatis includes a reduced genome of approximately 1.04 megabases, encoding approximately 900 genes. In addition to the chromosome that contains most of the genome, nearly all C. trachomatis strains carry a 7.5 kilobase plasmid that contains 8 genes. The role of this plasmid is unknown, although strains without the plasmid have been isolated, suggesting it is not essential for bacterial survival. Several important metabolic functions are not encoded in the C. trachomatis genome and are instead scavenged from the host cell.

== Carbohydrate Metabolism ==
C. trachomatis has a reduced metabolic capacity due to its smaller genome, which lacks genes for many biosynthetic pathways including those required for complete carbohydrate metabolism. The bacterium is largely dependent on the host cell for metabolic intermediates and energy, particularly in the form of adenosine triphosphate (ATP). C. trachomatis lacks several enzymes necessary for independent glucose metabolism, and instead utilizes two ATP/ADP translocases (Npt1 and Npt2) to import ATP from the host cell. Other metabolites including amino acids, nucleotides, and lipids are also transported from the host.

A critical enzyme involved in glycolysis, hexokinase, is absent in C. trachomatis, preventing the production of glucose-6-phosphate (G6P). Instead, G6P from the host cell is taken up by the metabolically active reticulate bodies (RBs) through a G6P transporter (UhpC antiporter). Although C. trachomatis lacks a complete independent glycolysis pathway, it has genes encoding for all the enzymes required for the Pentose Phosphate Pathway (PPP), gluconeogenesis, and glycogen synthesis and degradation.

Historically, EBs had been considered metabolically inactive, but research has shown otherwise. Studies have tested EB and RB metabolism outside the host cell and the results showed that both were capable of metabolic activity. The EBs and RBs were placed into a nutrient medium and tested many different energy sources to find that while RBs were able to take up ATP to make new proteins, EBs were able to use G6P to produce ATP which would then be used to make proteins. Ultimately, EBs can perform metabolic activities when it has access to G6P.

Cells infected by Chlamydia trachomatis often change how they produce and use energy because C. trachomatis depends on its host cell for energy. Cells infected by C. trachomatisshow increased levels of glycolysis. This is because the cell is increasing metabolic pathway activity to support the growth of both the host cell and C. trachomatis. The overall increase in glycolysis is slight and does not significantly affect host cell metabolism because oxidative phosphorylation rates remain the same.

== Life cycle ==
Life cycle

C. trachomatis has a life cycle consisting of two morphologically distinct forms. First, C. trachomatis attaches to a new host cell as a small, infectious form called the elementary body. The elementary body enters the host cell, surrounded by a host vacuole, called an intracytoplasmic inclusion. TarP (Translated Actin-Recruiting Protein) recruits host actin-nucleating machinery to create protrusive structures, then it recruits an enzyme called dynamin-2 to form a vesicle that engulfs the elementary body. TmeA (Translocated Membrane Effector A) binds and activates WASL (Neural Wiskott-Aldrich syndrome protein) to create a positive feedback loop that helps actin polymerization close the vesicle. Within the inclusion, C. trachomatis transforms into a larger, more metabolically active form called the reticulate body, which divides. The reticulate body substantially modifies the inclusion, making it a more hospitable environment for rapid replication of the bacteria. The reticulate bodies then transition back to resistant elementary bodies. The elementary bodies are released when the host cell ruptures or expels the inclusion, where they can then infect other cells.

== Role in disease ==
Clinical signs and symptoms of C. trachomatis infection in the genitalia present as the chlamydia infection, which may be asymptomatic or may resemble a gonorrhea infection. Both are common causes of multiple other conditions including pelvic inflammatory disease and urethritis.

Chlamydia trachomatis is the single most important infectious agent associated with blindness (trachoma), and it also affects the eyes in the form of inclusion conjunctivitis and is responsible for about 19% of adult cases of conjunctivitis.

C. pneumoniae and C. psittaci, infect the respiratory tract in humans and present as the chlamydia pneumoniae infection. While C. trachomatis can cause pneumonia, it has a very divided range of what age groups it can infect. C. trachomatis can spread pneumonitis through vertical transfer from an infected birth canal to a newborn, the most common incidence. There is about an 11-20% a baby will contract the disease if the mother is infected with symptoms usually showing up within the first 2 months after birth. Other than infants and young children, C. trachomatis has only really shown it is capable of causing pneumonia in immunocompromised adults.

=== Virulence factors ===
The chlamydial plasmid, a DNA molecule existing separately from the genome of C. trachomatis, functions to enhance genetic diversity via the genes encoded. The plasmid gene protein 3 (pgp3) has been linked to the establishment of persistent infection within the genital tract by suppressing the host immune response.

Polymorphic outer membrane proteins (Pmp proteins) on the surface of C. trachomatis use tropism to bind specific host cell receptors, which in turn initiates infection. Pmp proteins B, D, and H have been most associated with eliciting a pro-inflammatory response through the release of cytokines.

CPAF (Chlamydia Protease-like Activity Factor) functions by preventing the host from triggering the proper immune response. C. trachomatis use of CPAF targets and cleaves proteins that restructure the Golgi apparatus and activate DNA repair so that C. trachomatis is able to use the host cell machinery and proteins to its advantage.

=== Signs and symptoms ===
Most people infected with C. trachomatis are asymptomatic. However, the bacteria can present in one of three ways: genitourinary (genitals), pulmonary (lungs), and ocular (eyes).

Genitourinary cases in women include symptoms of unusual discharge, vaginal bleeding between periods, an increased need to pee, painful urinating, painful periods, painful intercourse, and itching or burning around the vagina. In men, symptoms typically only include painful urinating and unusual discharge.

When C. trachromatis infects the eye, it can cause conjunctivitis or trachoma. The early symptoms of these infections can cause irritation, redness, and discharge from the eye area. However, symptom progression with trachoma can cause the eyelashes to pull inward toward the eye after severe scarring, leading to corneal clouding, ulcers, or irreversible blindness. With conjunctivitis, blood-stained discharge from the eye can be seen.

In the throat, symptoms include pain and soreness. When the bacteria infects the lungs, it can cause pneumonia in infants one to three months old. Infections in older children and adults are rare. This will cause a choppy cough, rapid or labored breathing, nasal congestion, middle ear issues, and crackling lung sounds, which can develop gradually in infants. These symptoms will usually occur without a fever or any wheezing.

Chlamydia trachomatis may latently infect the chorionic villi tissues of pregnant women, thereby impacting pregnancy outcome. Researchers detected C. trachomatis DNA in chorionic villi in 3 out of 100 women who experienced a spontaneous miscarriage, and in 4 out of 100 women who voluntarily terminated their pregnancies. They were not able to prove that C. trachomatis directly causes miscarriages, but the study brings awareness to the possibility of infection and the pregnancy outcomes.

=== Prevalence ===
According to estimates from the World Health Organization, the global prevalence of genitourinary C. trachomatis infections in 2020 in people aged 15-49 was 4% in women and 2.5% in men. Approximately 128.5 million new infections were estimated to have occurred worldwide among people aged 15-49 in the same year. In the United States, in 2018, the estimated prevalence of chlamydial infections was 3.2 times as high in people between the ages of 15-24, compared to people between the ages of 25-39. Among people aged 15-39, 67.3% of all estimated existing chlamydial infections in the US in 2018 were accounted for in 15-24-year-olds. Risk factors established in women aged 20-29 in Copenhagen, Denmark for genitourinary infections include sexual contact with multiple partners, no condom use, low level of education, and younger age.

Pulmonary infections can occur in infants born to women with active chlamydia infections. An example of a pulmonary infection is perinatal pneumonia.

Ocular infections take the form of inclusion conjunctivitis or trachoma, both in adults and children. Based on data from March 2026, it was estimated that around 92 million people live in trachoma endemic areas, which puts them at higher risk of trachoma blindness. It was also estimated that around 1.9 million people are currently facing blindness or visual impairment due to trachoma. Trachoma is the leading infectious cause of blindness worldwide and is a neglected tropical disease that originally was targeted by the World Health Organization for elimination as a public health problem by 2020, but since has been updated to 2030.

=== Treatment ===
Treatment depends on the infection site, age of the patient, and whether another infection is present. Having a C. trachomatis and one or more other sexually transmitted infections at the same time is possible. Treatment is often done with both partners simultaneously to prevent reinfection. C. trachomatis may be treated with several antibiotic medications, including azithromycin, erythromycin, ofloxacin, and tetracycline.

According to the CDC, doxycycline is the preferred method of treatment when dealing with infections caused by chlamydia. Through many tests and trials, doxycycline was shown to be the more efficacious treatment for both men and women. Despite some uncertainties around the treatment for oropharyngeal C. trachomatis infections, doxycycline has been more effective than azithromycin when treating rectal C. trachomatis (100% to 74% microbiological cure). Azithromycin is dosed as a 1 gram tablet that is taken by mouth as a single dose, primarily to help with concerns of non-adherence. Treatment with generic doxycycline 100 mg twice a day for 7 days has equal success with expensive delayed-release doxycycline 200 mg once a day for 7 days. Erythromycin is less preferred as it may cause gastrointestinal side effects, which can lead to non-adherence. Levofloxacin and ofloxacin are generally no better than azithromycin or doxycycline and are more expensive.

If treatment is necessary during pregnancy, levofloxacin, ofloxacin, tetracycline, and doxycycline are not prescribed. In the case of a patient who is pregnant, the medications typically prescribed are azithromycin, amoxicillin, and erythromycin. Azithromycin is the recommended medication and is taken as a 1 gram tablet taken by mouth as a single dose. Despite amoxicillin having fewer side effects than the other medications for treating antenatal C. trachomatis infection, there have been concerns that pregnant women who take penicillin-class antibiotics can develop a chronic persistent chlamydia infection. Tetracycline is not used because some children and even adults can not withstand the drug, causing harm to the mother and fetus. Retesting during pregnancy can be performed three weeks after treatment. If the risk of reinfection is high, screening can be repeated throughout pregnancy.

If the infection has progressed, ascending the reproductive tract and pelvic inflammatory disease develops, damage to the fallopian tubes may have already occurred. In most cases, the C. trachomatis infection is then treated on an outpatient basis with azithromycin or doxycycline. Treating the mother of an infant with C. trachomatis of the eye, which can evolve into pneumonia, is recommended. The recommended treatment consists of oral erythromycin base or ethylsuccinate 50 mg/kg/day divided into four doses daily for two weeks while monitoring for symptoms of infantile hypertrophic pyloric stenosis (IHPS) in infants less than 6 weeks old.

There have been a few reported cases of C.trachomatis strains that were resistant to multiple antibiotic treatments. However, as of 2018, this is not a major cause of concern as antibiotic resistance is rare in C.trachomatis compared to other infectious bacteria.

=== Laboratory tests ===
Chlamydia species are readily identified and distinguished from other Chlamydia species using DNA-based tests. Tests for Chlamydia can be ordered from a doctor, a lab or online.

Most strains of C. trachomatis are recognized by monoclonal antibodies (mAbs) to epitopes in the VS4 region of MOMP. However, these mAbs may also cross-react with two other Chlamydia species, C. suis and C. muridarum.

- Nucleic acid amplification tests (NAATs) find the genetic material (DNA) of Chlamydia bacteria. These tests are the most sensitive tests available, meaning they are very accurate and are unlikely to have false-negative test results. A polymerase chain reaction (PCR) test is an example of a nucleic acid amplification test. This test can also be done on a urine sample, urethral swabs in men, or cervical or vaginal swabs in women.
- Nucleic acid hybridization tests (DNA probe test) also find Chlamydia DNA. A probe test is very accurate but is not as sensitive as NAATs.
- Enzyme-linked immunosorbent assay (ELISA, EIA) finds substances (Chlamydia antigens) that trigger the immune system to fight Chlamydia infection. Chlamydia Elementary body (EB)-ELISA could be used to stratify different stages of infection based upon Immunoglobulin-γ status of the infected individuals
- Direct fluorescent antibody test also finds Chlamydia antigens.
- Chlamydia cell culture is a test in which the suspected Chlamydia sample is grown in a vial of cells. The pathogen infects the cells, and after a set incubation time (48 hours), the vials are stained and viewed on a fluorescent light microscope. Cell culture is more expensive and takes longer (two days) than the other tests. The culture must be grown in a laboratory.

== Research ==
=== Antibiotic Resistance ===
Studies have revealed antibiotic resistance in Chlamydia trachomatis. Mutations in the 23S rRNA gene, including A2057G and A2059G, have been identified as significant contributors to resistance against azithromycin, a commonly used treatment. This resistance is linked to treatment failures and persistent infections, necessitating ongoing research into alternative antibiotics, such as moxifloxacin, as well as non-antibiotic approaches like bacteriophage therapy. These innovations aim to combat resistance while reducing the overall burden of antibiotic misuse, which has been closely associated with the rise of resistant strains in C. trachomatis populations.

=== Diagnostic Testing ===
Additionally, diagnostic improvements have played a vital role in identifying C. trachomatis infections more efficiently. Nucleic acid amplification tests (NAATs), such as DNA- and RNA-based tests, have shown high sensitivity and specificity, making them the gold standard for detecting asymptomatic infections. NAATs have facilitated broader screening programs, particularly in high-risk populations, and are integral to public health initiatives aimed at controlling the spread of C. trachomatis. Research continues into point-of-care diagnostic tools, which promise faster results and greater accessibility, especially in low-resource settings.

=== Persistence and Reinfection ===
Studies have challenged traditional assumptions about the transmission and persistence of C. trachomatis in the human body. In a study of heterosexual women with no history of receptive anal intercourse, researchers identified highly viable C. trachomatis in deep rectal samples (using a proctoscope), suggesting that gastrointestinal colonization may occur through non-anal routes such as vaginorectal transfer or oral exposure. Notably, the rectal and cervical strains often carried distinct MLST types, indicating that rectal infections may persist independently of concurrent genital infection. These findings point to the gastrointestinal tract as a potential long-term reservoir for C. trachomatis, with implications for diagnostics, treatment strategies, and reinfection risk.

Longitudinal molecular epidemiology studies have demonstrated that the cervicovaginal microbiome influences susceptibility to Chlamydia trachomatis infection and its natural history. In particular, molecularly defined subtypes of bacterial vaginosis (i.e., mBV-A) characterized by increased microbial diversity and enrichment of anaerobic taxa (particularly Candidatus Lachnocurva vaginae), have been associated with increased risk of incident infection, reinfection following treatment, and clinical sequelae including pelvic inflammatory disease and miscarriage. This finding support a model in which host-microbe interaction contribute to infection dynamics beyond traditional risk factors.

=== Vaccine Development ===
In the area of vaccine development, creating an effective vaccine for C. trachomatis has proven challenging due to the complex immune responses the bacterium elicits. Subunit vaccines, which target outer membrane proteins like MOMP (Major Outer Membrane Protein) and polymorphic membrane proteins (Pmp), are being explored in both animal models and early human trials. While these vaccines show promise in inducing partial immunity in murine models, further research is needed to evaluate their efficacy in humans. The goal is to develop a vaccine that can prevent reinfection without causing harmful inflammatory responses.

== History ==
Chlamydia trachomatis was first described in 1907 by Stanislaus von Prowazek and Ludwig Halberstädter in scrapings from trachoma cases. Thinking they had discovered a "mantled protozoan", they named the organism "Chlamydozoa" from the Greek "Chlamys" meaning mantle. Over the next several decades, "Chlamydozoa" was thought to be a virus as it was small enough to pass through bacterial filters and unable to grow on known laboratory media. However, in 1966, electron microscopy studies showed C. trachomatis to be a bacterium. This is essentially due to the fact that they were found to possess DNA, RNA, and ribosomes like other bacteria. It was originally believed that Chlamydia lacked peptidoglycan because researchers were unable to detect muramic acid in cell extracts. Subsequent studies determined that C. trachomatis synthesizes both muramic acid and peptidoglycan, but relegates it to the microbe's division septum and does not utilize it for construction of a cell wall. The bacterium is still classified as gram-negative.

Chlamydia trachomatis agent was first cultured and isolated in the yolk sacs of eggs by Tang Fei-fan et al. in 1957. This was a significant milestone because it became possible to preserve these agents, which could then be used for future genomic and phylogenetic studies. The isolation of C. trachomatis coined the term isolate to describe how C. trachomatis has been isolated from an in vivo setting into a "strain" in cell culture. Only a few "isolates" have been studied in detail, limiting the information that can be found on the evolutionary history of C. trachomatis.

== Evolution ==
In the 1990s it was shown that there are several species of Chlamydia. Chlamydia trachomatis was first described in historical records in Ebers papyrus written between 1553 and 1550 BC. In the ancient world, it was known as the blinding disease trachoma. The disease may have been closely linked with humans and likely predated civilization. It is now known that C. trachomatis comprises 19 serovars which are identified by monoclonal antibodies that react to epitopes on the major outer-membrane protein (MOMP). It has also been thought to have evolutionary ancestors dating back around 700 million years ago. Comparison of amino acid sequences reveals that MOMP contains four variable segments: S1,2 ,3 and 4. Different variants of the gene that encodes for MOMP, differentiate the genotypes of the different serovars. The antigenic relatedness of the serovars reflects the homology levels of DNA between MOMP genes, especially within these segments.

Furthermore, there have been over 220 Chlamydia vaccine trials done on mice and other non-human host species to target C. muridarum and C. trachomatis strains. However, it has been difficult to translate these results to the human species due to physiological and anatomical differences. Future trials are working with closely related species to humans.

== See also ==
- Translocated actin-recruiting phosphoprotein
