= Chlamydial pneumonia =

Chlamydial pneumonia may refer to pneumonia caused by one of several bacteria in the genus Chlamydia:

- Chlamydia trachomatis, best known for causing the common sexually transmitted infection chlamydia
- Chlamydia pneumoniae
- Chlamydia psittaci
