= C. felis =

C. felis may refer to:

- Chlamydophila felis, a bacterium species endemic among house cats worldwide, primarily causing inflammation of feline conjunctiva, rhinitis and respiratory problems
- Ctenocephalides felis, the cat flea, flea species

== See also ==
- Felis (disambiguation)
