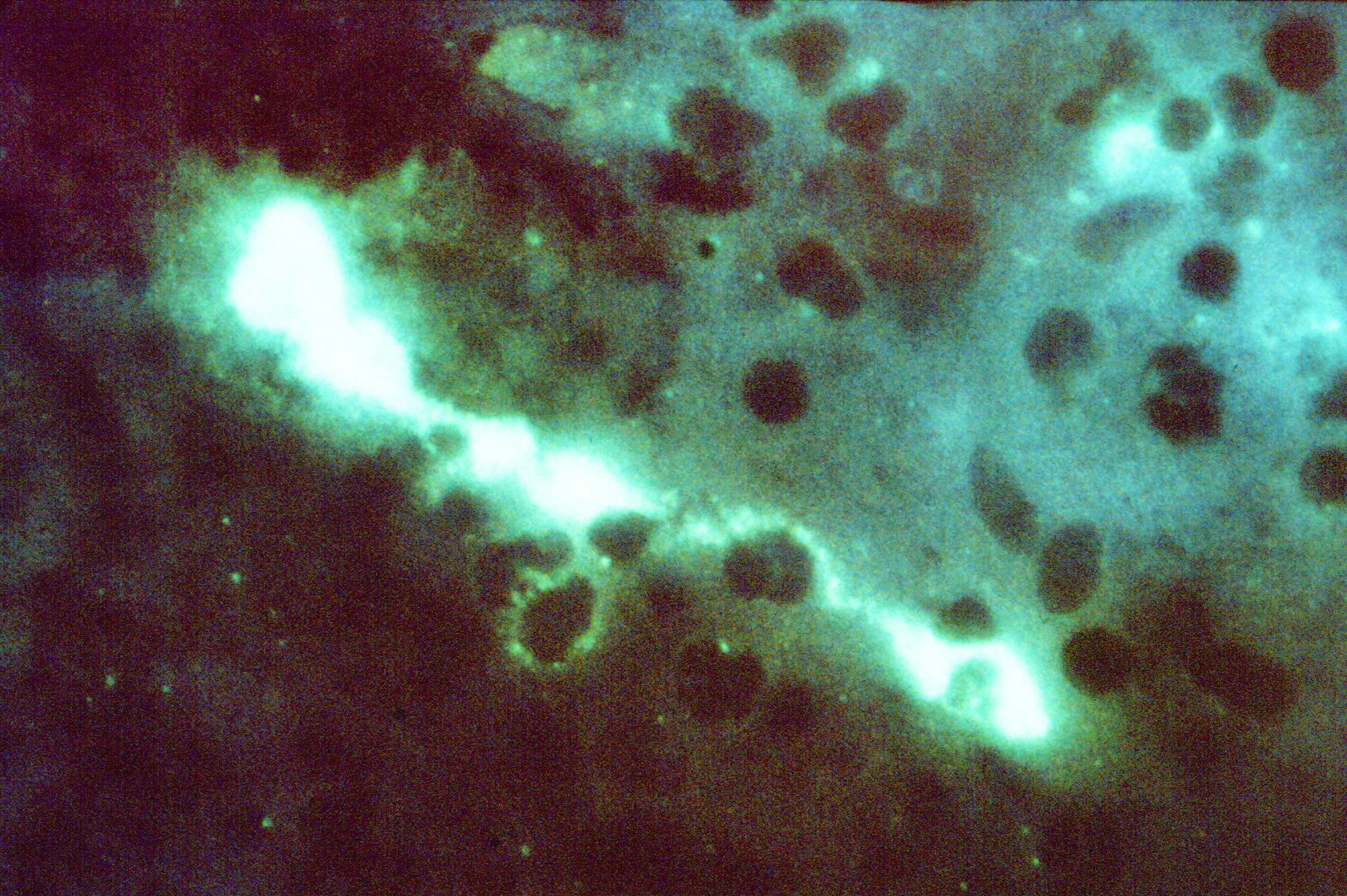
- Direct fluorescent antibody stain of a mouse brain impression smear showing C. psittaci.

Scientific classification
- Domain: Bacteria
- Kingdom: Pseudomonadati
- Phylum: Chlamydiota
- Class: Chlamydiia
- Order: Chlamydiales
- Family: Chlamydiaceae
- Genus: Chlamydia
- Species: C. psittaci

Binomial name
- Chlamydia psittaci (Lillie 1930) Page 1968 (Approved Lists 1980)

Synonyms
- Chlamydophila psittaci (Lillie 1930) Everett et al. 1999

= Chlamydia psittaci =

Species of bacterium

Chlamydia psittaci is a lethal intracellular bacterial species that may cause endemic avian chlamydiosis, epizootic outbreaks in other mammals, and respiratory psittacosis in humans. Potential hosts include feral birds and domesticated poultry, as well as cattle, pigs, sheep, and horses. C. psittaci is transmitted by inhalation, contact, or ingestion among birds and to mammals. Psittacosis in birds and in humans often starts with flu-like symptoms and becomes a life-threatening pneumonia. Many strains remain quiescent in birds until activated by stress. Birds are excellent, highly mobile vectors for the distribution of chlamydia infection, because they feed on, and have access to, the detritus of infected animals of all sorts.

Chlamydia psittaci in birds is often systemic, and infections can be inapparent, severe, acute, or chronic with intermittent shedding. C. psittaci strains in birds infect mucosal epithelial cells and macrophages of the respiratory tract. Septicaemia eventually develops and the bacteria become localized in epithelial cells and macrophages of most organs, conjunctiva, and gastrointestinal tracts. It can also be passed in the eggs. Stress will commonly trigger onset of severe symptoms, resulting in rapid deterioration and death. C. psittaci strains are similar in virulence, grow readily in cell culture, have 16S rRNA genes that differ by <0.8%, and belong to eight known serotypes. All should be considered to be readily transmissible to humans.

Chlamydia psittaci serovar A is endemic among psittacine birds and has caused sporadic zoonotic disease in humans, other mammals, and tortoises. Serovar B is endemic among pigeons, has been isolated from turkeys, and has also been identified as the cause of abortion in herds of dairy cattle. Serovars C and D are occupational hazards for slaughterhouse workers and for people in contact with birds. Serovar E isolates (known as Cal-10, MP or MN) have been obtained from a variety of avian hosts worldwide and, although they were associated with the 1920s–1930s outbreak in humans, a specific reservoir for serovar E has not been identified. The M56 and WC serovars were isolated during outbreaks in mammals. Many C. psittaci strains are susceptible to bacteriophages.

== Life cycle and method of infection ==
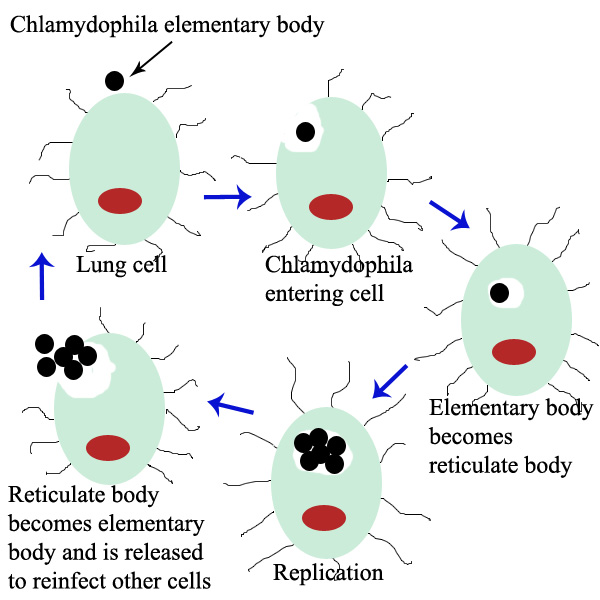
Lifecycle of C. psittaci

Chlamydia psittaci is a small bacterium (0.5μm) that undergoes several transformations during its lifecycle. It exists as an elementary body (EB) between hosts. The EB is not biologically active, but is resistant to environmental stresses and can survive outside a host. The EB travels from an infected bird to the lungs of an uninfected bird or person in small droplets, and is responsible for infection. Once in the lungs, the EB is taken up by cells in a pouch called an endosome by phagocytosis. However, the EB is not destroyed by fusion with lysosomes, as is typical for phagocytosed material. Instead, it transforms into a reticulate body and begins to replicate within the endosome. The reticulate bodies must use some of the host's cellular machinery to complete their replication. The reticulate bodies then convert back to elementary bodies, and are released back into the lung, often after causing the death of the host cell. The EBs are thereafter able to infect new cells, either in the same organism or in a new host. Thus, the lifecycle of C. psittaci is divided between the elementary body which is able to infect new hosts, but can not replicate, and the reticulate body, which replicates, but is not able to cause new infection.

== History ==
The disease caused by C. psittaci, psittacosis, was first characterized in 1879 when seven individuals in Switzerland were found to experience pneumonia after exposure to tropical pet birds. The causative pathogen was not known. The related bacterial species Chlamydia trachomatis was described in 1907, but was assumed to be a virus, as it could not be grown on artificial media. In the winter of 1929–1930, a psittacosis pandemic spread across the United States and Europe. Its mortality rate was 20% and as high as 80% for pregnant women. The disease's spread was eventually attributed to exposure to Amazon parrots imported from Argentina. Though C. psittaci was identified in 1930 as the agent responsible for psittacosis, it was not found to be a bacterium until examination by electron microscopy in the 1960s.

=== Taxonomy ===
For several decades, the family Chlamydiaceae contained a sole genus, Chlamydia. C. psittaci was originally classified from the 1960s to 1999 as a species of this sole genus. In 1999, the order Chlamydiales was assigned two new families (Parachlamydiaceae and Simkaniaceae), and within the family Chlamydiaceae, the genus Chlamydia was divided into two genera, Chlamydia and the newly designated genus Chlamydophila, with C. psittaci becoming Chlamydophila psittaci. However, this reclassification "was not wholly accepted or adopted" among microbiologists, which "resulted in a reversion to the single, original genus Chlamydia, which now encompasses all 9 species including C. psittaci." A new species was added to the reunited genus Chlamydia in 2013, two more were added in 2014.

What were once classified as the mammal-endemic C. psittaci abortion, C. psittaci feline, and C. psittaci guinea pig are since 1999 three separate species, C. abortus, C. felis, and C. caviae. New species continue to be described from inside of what was thought to be C. psittaci. Being a pathogen with a very broad host range, C. psittaci has a lot of opportunities to recombine with other Chlamydia.

Genotypes of C. psittaci are defined by the partial ompA sequence, which is immunologically relevant and can be amplified by PCR. The main types are A-F, E/B, with G, G1, G2, 1V, 6N, Mat116, R54, YP84, CPX0308, I, and J considered provisional. This has since been expanded into a seven-partial-gene MLST scheme. The MLST scheme technically yields "sequence types" distinct from genotype assignment, but it usually recovers the genotype grouping anyways.

==== Psittaci-abortus intermediate ====
Phylogenetic trees show a relatively recent branch between C. psittaci and C. abortus. There are also many strains intermediate in position between strains clearly defined as belonging in either species, such as 84/2334 isolated from a parrot.

Vafin et al. (2007) believe that this intermediate position should be its own species "C. parapsittaci", which includes the genotypes C (strains GD, CT1, Par1), D (NJ1, 92-1293, TT3, 7344/2), G (strains Rostinovo-70, 250, PP-87, KC-93), F (strains VS225, 7778B15), and non-grouped strains WC, 84/2334, and R54. Genotypes C, D, and F are isolated from avians; G is isolated from livestock abortions in the former Soviet Union; and WC was isolated from a mammal. For the Rostinovo-70 strain, omp1, omp2, 16S, 23S, plasmid (all partial) sequences are available. All G genotype strains have the same plasmid sequence as the one in 84/2334, and the same 23S sequence as the three strains from genotype C.

Two provisional genotypes were defined in 2017: G1, G2. These too reflect an intermediate position, though because the author was unaware of Vafin's results, there was no comparison with Vafin's ompA sequences.

A new species was effectively published in 2019, C. buteonis, which consisted of one type strain RSHA from a red-shouldered hawk. This species occupies an intermediate position.

Longbottom et al. (2021) sequenced the whole genome of 84/2334. They find its entire genome, alongside that of genotypes G1 and G2, to be closer to C. abortus than to C. psittaci, despite the fact that it has a plasmid (typical C. abortus does not carry one). Analyses of seven MLST housekeeping gene fragments also find the same for genotype 1V, leading to the suggestion to transfer these three genotypes plus 84/2334 to C. abortus. On the other hand, C. buteonis was shown to be closer to C. psittaci than to C. abortus on MSLT, and intermediate with a long branch of its own on whole-genome NeighborNet. Vafin's four strains were not analyzed. WC and genotypes C, D, F were solidly placed in C. psittaci.

== Diseases ==
Chlamydia psittaci infection is also associated with schizophrenia. Many other kinds of infections have been associated with schizophrenia.

== Genomics ==
Like other Chlamydia, C. psittaci is an intracellular pathogen and has thus undergone significant genome reduction. Most C. psittaci genomes encode between 1,000 and 1,400 proteins. A total of 911 core genes were found to be present in all 20 strains sequenced by Read et al., corresponding to 90% of the genes present in each genome.

== Confirmation of diagnosis ==
In addition to symptoms and CHX, complement fixation, microimmunofluorescence, and polymerase chain reaction tests can be used to confirm the diagnosis.

== Treatment ==
Tetracycline or macrolides can be used to treat this condition. The drugs are given intravenously or orally, depending on drug choice. Treatment should continue for 10–14 days after the fever subsides. In children or pregnant women, though, tetracycline should not be used. Ibuprofen or acetaminophen, and fluids are also administered. Cannabis or tobacco smoke should be avoided. While taking tetracycline, dairy products should be avoided.

== See also ==
- Chlamydia infection
- Koala (Phascolarctos cinereus)
