= Waddlia =

Scientific classification
- Domain: Bacteria
- Kingdom: Pseudomonadati
- Phylum: Chlamydiota
- Class: Chlamydiia
- Order: Chlamydiales
- Family: Waddliaceae
- Genus: Waddlia; Rurangirwa et al. 1999

Type species
- Waddlia chondrophila Rurangirwa et al. 1999

Species
- W. chondrophila Rurangirwa et al. 1999; "W. malaysiensis" Chua et al. 2005

Genus of bacteria

Waddlia is a genus of bacteria in its own family, Waddliaceae. Species in this genus have a Chlamydia-like cycle of replication and their ribosomal RNA genes are 80–90% identical to ribosomal genes in the Chlamydiaceae.

The type species is Waddlia chondrophila strain WSU 86-1044T, which was isolated from the tissues of a first-trimester aborted bovine fetus. Isolated in 1986, this species was originally characterized as a Rickettsia. DNA sequencing of the ribosomal genes corrected the characterization. Another W. chondrophila strain, 2032/99, was found along with Neospora caninum in a septic stillborn calf.

Waddlia chondrophila may be linked to miscarriages in pregnant women. A study found Waddlia chondrophila present in the placenta and vagina of 32 women, 10 of which who had miscarriages. It is hypothesized that the bacterial grows in placental cells, damaging the placenta.

The species Waddlia malaysiensis G817 has been proposed. W. malaysiensis was identified in the urine of Malaysian fruit bats (Eonycteris spelaea).

== See also ==
- List of bacterial orders
- List of bacteria genera
