= Simkaniaceae =

Scientific classification
- Domain: Bacteria
- Kingdom: Pseudomonadati
- Phylum: Chlamydiota
- Class: Chlamydiia
- Order: Chlamydiales
- Family: Simkaniaceae; Everett, Bush & Andersen 1999

Genera
- "Ca. Algichlamydia"; "Ca. Amphrikana"; "Ca. Fritschea"; "Ca. Neptunichlamydia"; Simkania; "Ca. Syngnamydia"

Family of bacteria

Simkaniaceae is a family of bacteria in the order Chlamydiales, class Chlamydiia, phylum Chlamydiota, domain Bacteria. Species in this family have a chlamydia-like cycle of replication and their ribosomal RNA genes are 80–90% identical to ribosomal genes in the Chlamydiaceae. The Simkaniaceae are not recognized by monoclonal antibodies that are specific for Chlamydiaceae lipopolysaccharide. The family Simkaniaceae currently includes two genera: Simkania and Fritschea. The type species is Simkania negevensis, and its natural host is not known. It is readily grown in monolayers of eukaryotic Vero cells. Serological evidence and PCR indicate that S. negevensis is widespread among humans.

Two Fritschea species have been identified in insects. These are candidatus species because they only grow in insect bacteriocytes and have not been cultured in vitro. Whiteflies are the host of Candidatus Fritschea bemisiae (strain Falk). Scale insects are the host of Candidatus Fritschea eriococci (strain Elm).

Simkania negevensis and Fritschea bemisiae have a group I intron in the 23S rRNA, unlike other characterized chlamydial rRNA genes. The introns are closely related to group I introns in the 23S rRNA of chloroplasts and mitochondria in algae and amoebae.

== Taxonomy ==
The currently accepted taxonomy is based on the List of Prokaryotic names with Standing in Nomenclature (LPSN) and National Center for Biotechnology Information (NCBI).

16S rRNA based LTP_10_2024

- - Simkaniaceae
    Simkania

120 marker proteins based GTDB 10-RS226

- - - JAJFMI01
      "Ca. Algichlamydia"
    - JACRBE01
      "Ca. Amphritriteisimkania"
  - - Simkaniaceae
      - "Ca. Neptunichlamydia"
      - Simkania

- "Ca. Algichlamydia" Maire et al. 2024
  - "Ca. Algichlamydia australiensis" Maire et al. 2024
- "Ca. Amphritriteisimkania" Davison & Hurst 2023 ["Ca. Amphrikana" (sic)]
  - "Ca. A. amoebophyrae" Davison & Hurst 2023
- "Ca. Fritschea" Everett et al. 2005
  - "Ca. F. bemisiae" Everett et al. 2005
  - "Ca. F. eriococci" Everett et al. 2005
- "Ca. Neptunichlamydia" corrig. Pizzetti et al. 2016
  - "Ca. N. vexilliferae" corrig. Pizzetti et al. 2016
- Simkania Everett, Bush & Andersen 1999
  - S. negevensis Everett, Bush & Andersen 1999
- "Ca. Syngnamydia" Fehr et al. 2013
  - "Ca. S. medusae" Viver et al. 2017
  - "Ca. S. salmonis" Nylund et al. 2015
  - "Ca. S. veneta" corrig. Fehr et al. 2013

== See also ==
- List of bacterial orders
- List of bacteria genera
