= Chlamydia research =

Chlamydia research is the systematic study of the organisms in the taxonomic group of bacteria Chlamydiota (formerly Chlamydiae), the diagnostic procedures to treat infections, the disease chlamydia, infections caused by the organisms, the epidemiology of infection and the development of vaccines. The process of research can include the participation of many researchers who work in collaboration from separate organizations, governmental entities and universities.

== Funding ==
The Centers for Disease Control and Prevention (CDC) offers funding to research the biology, physiology, epidemiology, vaccine development, and publish systematic reviews of Chlamydia species. Other funding sources include the National Chlamydia Coalition.

== Institutes ==
=== NIAID ===
Studies continue to determine the organism's genetic makeup. NIAID-supported scientists have determined the complete genome (genetic blueprint) for C. trachomatis.

=== Max Planck Institute for Infection Biology ===
The Max Planck Institute for Infection Biology continues its research into chlamydia infection. The institute has published over 140 studies related to chlamydia.

=== Queensland University of Technology ===
There are research projects in several areas at the Queensland University of Technology, including development of a human vaccine for chlamydial sexually transmitted disease and understanding basic mechanisms of regulation, including the importance of chlamydial proteases. Chlamydia infections in wildlife are part of the research into chlamydia, particularly koalas' genomics and gene regulation studies in chlamydia.

A sample list of primary publications:

10.1111/j.1574-695X.2011.00843.x
10.1186/1471-2334-6-152

=== University of Southampton ===
Vaccine development at the University of Southampton continues.

== Vaccine ==
Vaccine research is ongoing in independent and institutional settings. CTH522 has completed phase 1 trials

== Clinical studies ==
=== Clinical trials ===
Clinical trials are used by researchers investigating the efficacy of interventions or protocol in the epidemiology, detection, prevention and treatment of chlamydia infections. Interventions are the use of medical products, medication, devices, procedures or changes in the participants' behavior. The effects on the participants are measured and compared to previous trials, placebo or a new medical approach, or to no intervention. The National Institutes of Health support ongoing research in the study of chlamydia infection. At least 113 studies have been initiated as of 2015. One example was the clinical trial of eye prophylaxis in newborns in the prevention of neonatal conjunctivitis caused by Chlamydia trachomatis.

=== Observational studies ===
Research related to chlamydia can take the form of an observational study. This type of study assesses outcomes in groups of participants according to a research plan or protocol. The volunteers in the study may receive interventions such as medical products, medications, devices, or procedures as part of their routine medical care. The volunteers in this type of study are not assigned to specific interventions as in a clinical trial. An example of an observational study regarding chlamydia infection was "Non-Invasive Sexually Transmitted Disease (STD) Testing in Women Seeking Emergency Contraception or Urine Pregnancy Testing: Meeting the Needs of an At-Risk Population" in 2010. Observational studies employ the use of randomised control studies.

== Case studies ==
Case studies that research the prevalence and prevention of chlamydia can include personal contact, a detailed history of the participants, extensive physical examinations, and related contextual conditions. Chlamydia case studies also can be produced by following a formal research method. These case studies are likely to appear in formal research venues, such as journals, professional conferences, and administrative science.

In doing case study research, the case being studied may be an individual, organization, event, or action, existing in a specific time and place. For instance, clinical science has produced both well-known case studies of individuals and also case studies of clinical practices.

== Evidence-based research ==
Evidence-based medicine chlamydia studies optimizes decision-making by employing the use of information based upon well-designed research. This approach to the study of chlamydia requires that only research conducted coming from meta-analyses, systematic reviews, and randomized controlled trials) can yield widely applied recommendations. Some examples of evidence-based research on chlamydia include:

- Chlamydia trachomatis and Genital Mycoplasmas: Pathogens with an Impact on Human Reproductive Health. Ljubin-Sternak S, Meštrović T. Journal Pathog. 2014;2014:183167. doi: 10.1155/2014/183167. Epub 2014 Dec 31.
- Screening for Gonorrhea and Chlamydia: Systematic Review to Update the U.S. Preventive Services Task Force Recommendations [Internet]. Nelson HD, Zakher B, Cantor A, Deagas M, Pappas M.Rockville (MD): Agency for Healthcare Research and Quality (US); 2014 Sep.
