= IHOP (disambiguation) =

IHOP may refer to:

- International House of Pancakes, known as IHOP
- Dine Brands, formerly known as "IHOP Corporation" and "dineEquity"
- International House of Prayer, an evangelical charismatic Pentecostal Christian missions organization in Kansas City, Missouri
- Information Hyperlinked over Proteins, or iHOP, is a web portal on gene and protein interactions mostly derived from abstracts of scientific publications

== See also ==
- House of Prayer (denomination), Christian group in the conservative holiness movement
