= Chlamydia abortus =

Scientific classification
- Domain: Bacteria
- Kingdom: Pseudomonadati
- Phylum: Chlamydiota
- Class: Chlamydiia
- Order: Chlamydiales
- Family: Chlamydiaceae
- Genus: Chlamydia
- Species: C. abortus

Binomial name
- Chlamydia abortus Everett et al. 1999

Species of bacterium

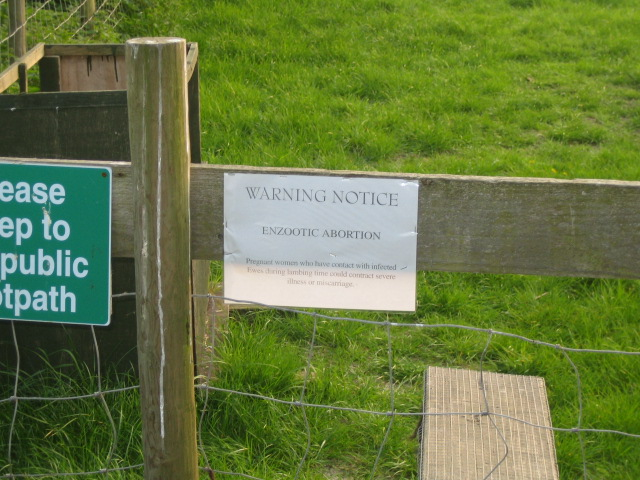
Warning notice about C. abortus on a live stock pen.

Chlamydia abortus is a species in Chlamydiota that causes abortion and fetal death in mammals, including humans. It was originally proposed as Chlamydophila abortus by a split from Chlamydia psittaci in 1999, based on differences of pathogenicity and DNA–DNA hybridization. The assignment of Cp. abortus and Cp. psittaci to a new genus Chlamydophila was based on a lack of evident glycogen production and on resistance to the antibiotic sulfadiazine. In 2015, this new genus was reverted to Chlamydia, but C. abortus remains as a distinct species.

== In humans ==
There are approximately one or two cases of C. abortus infection in pregnant women diagnosed in the United Kingdom per year. Typically transmission occurs from contact with livestock who have recently given birth. The true prevalence in humans is unknown because the routine serological antibody test (complement fixation test) is unable to distinguish between C. abortus and other more common species such as Chlamydia trachomatis.

== In other animals ==
Chlamydia abortus is endemic among ruminants such as cows and sheep and has been associated with abortion in a horse, a rabbit, guinea pigs, mice, pigs and humans. Infected females shed bacteria near the time of ovulation, so C. abortus is transmitted orally and sexually among mammals. All "typical" C. abortus strains were isolated or PCR-amplified from the placenta or fetal organs after spontaneous abortion. C. abortus infection generally remains unapparent until an animal aborts late in gestation or gives birth to a weak or dead fetus.

Chlamydia abortus has been isolated from birds. For a discussion of this intermediate status, see Chlamydia psittaci § Psittaci-abortus intermediate.

== Genome structure ==
Chlamydia abortus has a relatively small genome that contains 1.14 Mbp with 961 protein coding genes.
