= Simkania =

Scientific classification
- Domain: Bacteria
- Kingdom: Pseudomonadati
- Phylum: Chlamydiota
- Class: Chlamydiia
- Order: Chlamydiales
- Family: Simkaniaceae
- Genus: Simkania; Everett, Bush & Andersen 1999

Type species
- Simkania negevensis Everett, Bush & Andersen 1999

Species
- S. negevensis

Genus of bacteria

Simkania, is a genus of bacteria belonging to the Chlamydiota. The only species of this genus is Simkania negevensis.

== See also ==
- List of bacterial orders
- List of bacteria genera
