= Chlamydia muridarum =

Scientific classification
- Domain: Bacteria
- Kingdom: Pseudomonadati
- Phylum: Chlamydiota
- Class: Chlamydiia
- Order: Chlamydiales
- Family: Chlamydiaceae
- Genus: Chlamydia
- Species: C. muridarum

Binomial name
- Chlamydia muridarum Everett et al., 1999

Species of bacterium

Chlamydia muridarum is an intracellular bacterial species that at one time was considered a biovar "mouse pneumonitis" (MoPn) inside of Chlamydia trachomatis. However, C. trachomatis naturally only infects humans and C. muridarum naturally infects only members of the family Muridae (includes both mice and hamsters, Alderton, 1996).

Two strains of Chlamydia muridarum, MoPn (originally named Nigg) and SFPD, have been isolated from mice and hamsters. Glycogen production by both strains has been demonstrated. The chromosome and extrachromosomal plasmid of MoPn have been sequenced.

Chlamydia muridarum MoPn binds mAbs recognizing Chlamydia trachomatis MOMP vs4 core epitope (T) LNPT (IA). DNA sequence analysis indicates that these mAbs should recognize SFPD and that Chlamydia trachomatis B-serogroup mAbs specific for the vs4 epitope IAGAG should recognize SFPD. MoPn was isolated in 1942 from the lungs of asymptomatic albino Swiss mice and was subsequently shown to be capable of producing disease in mice. SFPD was obtained from a hamster, concurrent with a causative agent of proliferative ileitis. MoPn has been shown to be sensitive to sulfadiazine.

In contrast to Chlamydia trachomatis, Chlamydia muridarum lacks a tryptophan operon. Due to this, Chlamydia muridarum responds to interferon gamma (IFN-γ) differently than Chlamydia trachomatis, which effects the degree to which the two different Chlamydia strains are inhibited in infected mice and humans, respectively.

== Genome structure ==
The genome of several strains has been sequenced.
