= Translocated actin-recruiting phosphoprotein =

Identifiers
- Symbol: tarp
- UniProt: O84462
Search for
- Structures: Swiss-model
- Domains: InterPro

The translocated actin-recruiting phosphoprotein (Tarp) is a protein that may mediate the invasion of epithelial cells by Chlamydia trachomatis using a type three secretion system.
