= Chlamydia caviae =

Scientific classification
- Domain: Bacteria
- Kingdom: Pseudomonadati
- Phylum: Chlamydiota
- Class: Chlamydiia
- Order: Chlamydiales
- Family: Chlamydiaceae
- Genus: Chlamydia
- Species: C. caviae

Binomial name
- Chlamydia caviae (Everett et al. 1999) Sachse et al. 2024

Synonyms
- Chlamydophila caviae Everett et al. 1999

Species of bacterium

Chlamydia caviae is a bacterium that can be recovered from the conjunctiva of Guinea pigs suffering from ocular inflammation and eye discharge. It is also possible to infect the genital tract of Guinea pigs with C. caviae and elicit a disease that is very similar to human Chlamydia trachomatis infection. C. caviae infects primarily the mucosal epithelium and is not invasive.

Chlamydia caviae is markedly specific for Guinea pigs, as attempts to infect mice, hamsters, rabbits and gerbils have been unsuccessful, except for one experimentally infected gerbil. The five known C. caviae isolates are indistinguishable, based on ompA gene sequence.

== Genome structure ==
Chlamydia caviae has a relatively small genome that contains 1.17 Mbp with 998 protein coding genes. Additionally, C. caviae strain GPIC contains an extrachromosomal plasmid, pCpGP1.
