= Patient-delivered therapy =

Practice of treating the sex partners of people diagnosed with chlamydia or gonorrhea

- Other names: Expedited partner therapy (EPT)

Patient-delivered (partner) therapy (PDT or PDPT) is the practice of treating the sex partners of people diagnosed with chlamydia or gonorrhea by providing prescriptions or medications to the person to take to their partner without the health care provider first examining the partner. EPT may also include other forms of implementation than PDPT.

== Efficacy ==
PDPT works as an addition to the usual patient referral, the latter being that the index patient has a responsibility for informing sex partners of their exposure to a sexually transmitted infection. PDPT significantly reduces the risk of persistent or recurrent infection compared with patient referral alone; a review found that addition of PDPT gives a relative risk of 0.73, with a 95% confidence interval of 0.57 to 0.93.

Pitfalls include that PDT may compromise the quality of care provided to partners, especially when used as a first-line approach for partners who would otherwise seek clinical services. For instance, the medication could cause serious adverse reactions, including allergy, which could have been foreseen by a visit to a health care provider.

== See also ==
- Sexually transmitted disease
