= Rhabdochlamydia =

Scientific classification (Candidatus)
- Domain: Bacteria
- Kingdom: Pseudomonadati
- Phylum: Chlamydiota
- Class: Chlamydiia
- Order: Chlamydiales
- Family: Rhabdochlamydiaceae
- Genus: Rhabdochlamydia; Kostanjsek et al. 2004

Type species
- "Ca. Rhabdochlamydia porcellionis" Kostanjsek et al. 2004

Species
- "Ca. R. crassificans"; "Ca. R. helvetica"; "Ca. R. oedothoracis"; "Ca. R. porcellionis"

Genus of bacteria

Candidatus Rhabdochlamydia is a genus of intracellular bacteria and the sole genus in the family Candidatus Rhabdochlamydiaceae. As a Candidatus taxon, no-one has yet managed to culture them in vitro for deposition in a culture collection.

Two Rhabdochlamydia species have been characterized and validly proposed. Their ribosomal RNA genes are 96.3% identical. These gene sequences are 82%–87% identical to those of most Chlamydiales. These data and analysis of Rhabdochlamydia morphology indicates that these species belong to the bacterial order Chlamydiales.

== Species ==
The genus consists of the following two valid species:

- Candidatus Rhabdochlamydia crassificans Kostanjšek et al. 2004 – detected in the cockroach Blatta orientalis
- Candidatus Rhabdochlamydia porcellionis Corsaro et al. 2006 – detected in hepatopancreas of the woodlouse Porcellio scaber

== See also ==
- List of taxa with candidatus status
