= Chlamydia suis =

Scientific classification
- Domain: Bacteria
- Kingdom: Pseudomonadati
- Phylum: Chlamydiota
- Class: Chlamydiia
- Order: Chlamydiales
- Family: Chlamydiaceae
- Genus: Chlamydia
- Species: C. suis

Binomial name
- Chlamydia suis Everett et al. 1999

Species of bacterium

Chlamydia suis is a member of the genus Chlamydia. C. suis has only been isolated from swine, in which it may be endemic. Glycogen has been detected in Chlamydia suis inclusions in infected swine tissues and in cell culture. C. suis is associated with conjunctivitis, enteritis and pneumonia in swine.

Some strains have enhanced resistance to sulfadiazine and tetracycline. Several strains of C. suis are known to have an extrachromosomal plasmid, pCS. C. suis strains are somewhat more diverse than are other chlamydial species. The deduced ompA gene products of various Chlamydia suis strains contain vs4 epitopes TLNPTIAG(A.K.T)G(D.K.N.T), TWNPTIAGAGS or TLNPTISGKGQ. These epitopes are identical or nearly identical to the Chlamydia MOMP core epitopes NPTI, TLNPTI, LNPTIA or LNPTI, which are recognized by Chlamydia trachomatis vs4 mAbs. They are also identical or nearly identical to TIAGAGD and IAGAG epitopes, which are recognized by C. trachomatis B-serogroup mAbs.
