= L,L-diaminopimelate aminotransferase =

Biochemical enzyme catalyst

Identifiers
- EC no.: 2.6.1.83

Databases
- IntEnz: IntEnz view
- BRENDA: BRENDA entry
- ExPASy: NiceZyme view
- KEGG: KEGG entry
- MetaCyc: metabolic pathway
- PRIAM: profile
- PDB structures: RCSB PDB PDBe PDBsum
- Gene Ontology: AmiGO / QuickGO
Search
- PMC: articles
- PubMed: articles
- NCBI: proteins

L,L-diaminopimelate aminotransferase (EC 2.6.1.83) is a pyridoxal phosphate-dependent enzyme that catalyzes the chemical reaction

(1)
+
L-glutamic acid
H_{2}O
(2)
+
α-ketoglutaric acid

The three substrates of this enzyme characterised from plants are (S)-2,3,4,5-tetrahydrodipicolinic acid (1), L-glutamic acid, and water. Its products are (S,S)-2,6-diaminopimelic acid a.k.a. L,L-diaminopimelic acid (2) and α-ketoglutaric acid. The product (2) goes on in a biosynthetic pathway leading to the amino acid lysine.

This enzyme is a transferases, specifically a transaminase, which transfer nitrogenous groups. The systematic name of this enzyme class is LL-2,6-diaminoheptanedioate:2-oxoglutarate aminotransferase. Other names in common use include LL-diaminopimelate transaminase, LL-DAP aminotransferase, and LL-DAP-AT.

== Structural studies ==
As of late 2007, two structures have been solved for this class of enzymes, with PDB accession codes PDB: 2Z1Z and PDB: 2Z20.
