= Felis (disambiguation) =

Felis may refer to:

- Felis, a genus of cats in the family Felidae, including the domestic cat and its closest wild relatives
- Felis Britannica, the United Kingdom Member of the Fédération Internationale Féline
- Felis, the proper name of the star HD 85951 in the constellation of Hydra.
- Felis (constellation), a now-obsolete constellation created by Jérôme Lalande in 1799
- Riggu Felis, an anthropomorphic wildcat in the Redwall series by Brian Jacques
- Stefano Felis (ca. 1538-1603), a Neapolitan Italian composer
- "-felis", a suffix used to denote cats in taxonomy
