= Chlamydia pecorum =

Scientific classification
- Domain: Bacteria
- Kingdom: Pseudomonadati
- Phylum: Chlamydiota
- Class: Chlamydiia
- Order: Chlamydiales
- Family: Chlamydiaceae
- Genus: Chlamydia
- Species: C. pecorum

Binomial name
- Chlamydia pecorum Fukushi & Hirai 1992

Synonyms
- Chlamydophila pecorum (Fukushi & Hirai 1992) Everett et al. 1999

Species of bacterium

Chlamydia pecorum, also known as Chlamydophila pecorum is a species of Chlamydiaceae that originated from ruminants, such as cattle, sheep and goats. It has also infected koalas and swine. C. pecorum strains are serologically and pathogenically diverse.

In the koalas, C. pecorum causes infections in the reproductive systems and urinary tract, as well as pneumonia, infertility, and death. It is considered one of the most important infectious diseases that currently plagues koalas. C. pecorum is the most common chlamydial species to infect koalas and is the most pathogenic. In other animals, C. pecorum has been associated with abortion, conjunctivitis, encephalomyelitis, enteritis, arthritis, and polyarthritis.
