= International Protein Index =

Protein database

The International Protein Index (IPI) is a defunct protein database launched in 2001 by the European Bioinformatics Institute (EBI), and closed in 2011. Its purpose was to provide the proteomics community with a resource that enables

- accession numbers from a variety of bioinformatics databases to be mapped
- a complete set of proteins for a species i.e. a reference set

In its last version, the IPI contained the complete reference sets for six animal species: Homo sapiens (human), Mus musculus (mouse), Rattus norvegicus (rat), Bos taurus (cattle), Gallus gallus (chicken) and Danio rerio (zebrafish); and one plant species: Arabidopsis thaliana (thale cress). The human, mouse and rat datasets were the first to be developed, combining information taken from the Swiss-Prot, TrEMBL, Ensembl and RefSeq databases.

== History ==
In 2001, when the IPI was launched, databases cataloguing human genes varied greatly and had few links between them. Since then, much more data has been produced giving a more complete picture and databases have collaborated to synchronize data. Currently many model organisms have a reference set of genes/proteins which are catalogued in Ensembl/UniProt respectively, as well as other species specific databases. Because of this redundancy, the IPI was retired in 2011. EBI advised users of its services to employ UniProtKB accession numbers as their protein identifiers.
