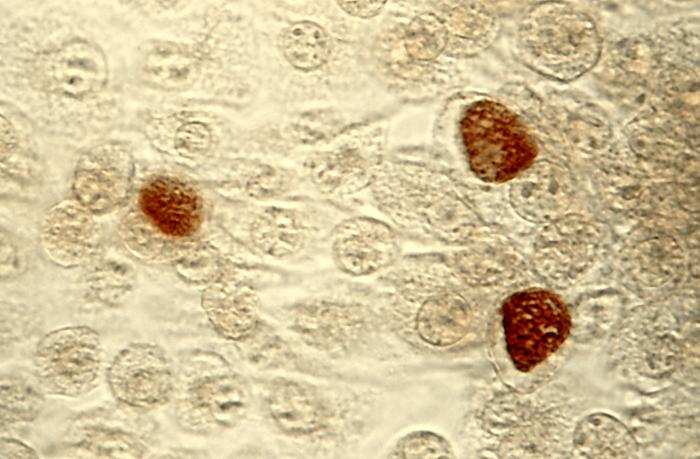
- Chlamydia trachomatis

Scientific classification
- Domain: Bacteria
- Kingdom: Pseudomonadati
- Superphylum: "PVC"
- Phylum: Chlamydiota; Garrity & Holt 2021
- Class: Chlamydiia; Horn 2016

Orders and families
- "Similichlamydiales"; Chlamydiales

Synonyms
- Chlamydiota: "Chlamydaeota" Oren et al. 2015; "Chlamydiae" Garrity and Holt 2001; "Chlamydiota" Whitman et al. 2018; "Chlamydobacteriae" Buchanan 1917; Chlamydiia: Chlamydiae Cavalier-Smith 2002; "Chlamydozoa" Moshkovskiy 1945

= Chlamydiota =

Phylum of bacteria

The Chlamydiota (synonym Chlamydiae) are a bacterial phylum and class whose members are remarkably diverse, including pathogens of humans and animals, symbionts of ubiquitous protozoa, and marine sediment forms not yet well understood. All of the Chlamydiota that humans have known about for many decades are obligate intracellular bacteria; in 2020 many additional Chlamydiota were discovered in ocean-floor environments, and it is not yet known whether they all have hosts.

Of various Chlamydiota that cause human disease, the two most important species are Chlamydia pneumoniae, which causes a type of pneumonia, and Chlamydia trachomatis, which causes chlamydia. Chlamydia is the most common bacterial sexually transmitted infection in the United States, and 2.86 million chlamydia infections are reported annually.

== Biology ==
=== Ecology and life cycle ===
Among the Chlamydiota, all of the ones long known to science grow only by infecting eukaryotic host cells. They are as small as or smaller than many viruses. They are ovoid in shape and stain Gram-negative. They are dependent on replication inside the host cells; thus, some species are termed obligate intracellular pathogens and others are symbionts of ubiquitous protozoa. Most intracellular Chlamydiota are located in an inclusion body or vacuole; when growing in a cell, they survive in a metabolically active but noninfectious form called the reticulate body. Outside cells, they survive only as an infectious, spore-like form called the elementary body.

These Chlamydiota can grow only where their host cells grow, and develop according to a characteristic biphasic developmental cycle. Therefore, clinically relevant Chlamydiota cannot be propagated in bacterial culture media in the clinical laboratory. They are most successfully isolated while still inside their host cells.

In 2020 many additional Chlamydiota were discovered in ocean-floor environments, and it is not yet known whether they all have hosts.

=== Peptidoglycan ===
Scientists have long known that Chlamydiota are susceptible to antibiotics that target the production of peptidoglycan (PG) such as penicillin, yet have for a long time failed to find any PG in their cell walls. In 2013, Protochlamydia amoebophila was shown to have a sacculus made of PG while Simkania negevensis does not. There is no FtsZ gene, which is previously believed to be essential for cell division in the presence of PG, in either of them. In 2014, the human pathogen Chlamydia trachomatis was shown to contain PG in its intracellular stage, apparently forming rings. In 2016, the role of PG in Chlamydia was clarified using more data: it does not make a whole sacculus around the cell like usual bacteria and Protochlamydia do, but instead produces a thin ring of PG down the middle during cell division. MreB controls the production of the ring, taking up the role that FtsZ would've performed. This explains why penicillin is bacteriostatic and not bacteriocidal to Chlamydia.

The elemental bodies of Chlamydiaare characterized by the presence of a tough cell wall. This wall is not made of PG, but instead consists of a network of proteins.

== History ==
Chlamydia-like disease affecting the eyes of people was first described in ancient Chinese and Egyptian manuscripts. A modern description of chlamydia-like organisms was provided by Halberstaedrrter and von Prowazek in 1907.

Chlamydial isolates cultured in the yolk sacs of embryonating eggs were obtained from a human pneumonitis outbreak in the late 1920s and early 1930s, and by the mid-20th century, isolates had been obtained from dozens of vertebrate species. The term chlamydia (a cloak) appeared in the literature in 1945, although other names continued to be used, including Bedsonia, Miyagawanella, ornithosis-, TRIC-, and PLT-agents. In 1956, Chlamydia trachomatis was first cultured by Tang Fei-fan, though they were not yet recognized as bacteria.

== Nomenclature ==
In 1966, Chlamydiota were recognized as bacteria and the genus Chlamydia was validated. The order Chlamydiales was created by Storz and Page in 1971. The class Chlamydiia was recently validly published. Between 1989 and 1999, new families, genera, and species were recognized. The phylum Chlamydiae was established in Bergey's Manual of Systematic Bacteriology. By 2006, genetic data for over 350 chlamydial lineages had been reported. Discovery of ocean-floor forms reported in 2020 involves new clades. In 2022 the phylum was renamed Chlamydiota.

== Taxonomy and molecular signatures ==
The Chlamydiota currently contain eight validly named genera, and 14 genera. The phylum presently consist of two orders (Chlamydiales, Parachlamydiales) and nine families within a single class (Chlamydiia). Only four of these families are validly named (Chlamydiaceae, Parachlamydiaceae, Simkaniaceae, Waddliaceae) while five are described as families (Clavichlamydiaceae, Criblamydiaceae, Parilichlamydiaceae, Piscichlamydiaceae, and Rhabdochlamydiaceae).

The Chlamydiales order as recently described contains the families Chlamydiaceae, and the Clavichlamydiaceae, while the new Parachlamydiales order harbors the remaining seven families. This proposal is supported by the observation of two distinct phylogenetic clades that warrant taxonomic ranks above the family level. Molecular signatures in the form of conserved indels (CSIs) and proteins (CSPs) have been found to be uniquely shared by each separate order, providing a means of distinguishing each clade from the other and supporting the view of shared ancestry of the families within each order. The distinctness of the two orders is also supported by the fact that no CSIs were found among any other combination of families.

Molecular signatures have also been found that are exclusive for the family Chlamydiaceae. The Chlamydiaceae originally consisted of one genus, Chlamydia, but in 1999 was split into two genera, Chlamydophila and Chlamydia. The genera have since 2015 been reunited where species belonging to the genus Chlamydophila have been reclassified as Chlamydia species.

However, CSIs and CSPs have been found specifically for Chlamydophila species, supporting their distinctness from Chlamydia, perhaps warranting additional consideration of two separate groupings within the family. CSIs and CSPs have also been found that are exclusively shared by all Chlamydia that are further indicative of a lineage independent from Chlamydophila, supporting a means to distinguish Chlamydia species from neighbouring Chlamydophila members.

The currently accepted taxonomy is based on the List of Prokaryotic names with Standing in Nomenclature (LPSN) and National Center for Biotechnology Information (NCBI).

- "Similichlamydiales" Pallen, Rodriguez-R & Alikhan 2022 [Hat2 GTDB]
  - Family "Parilichlamydiaceae" Stride et al. 2013 ["Similichlamydiaceae" Pallen, Rodriguez-R & Alikhan 2022]
  - Family "Piscichlamydiaceae" Horn 2010 – based on phylogeny in Gupta et al. (2015).
- Order Chlamydiales Storz & Page 1971
  - Family "Actinochlamydiaceae" Steigen et al. 2013
  - Family "Criblamydiaceae" Thomas, Casson & Greub 2006
  - Family Chlamydiaceae Rake 1957
  - Family Parachlamydiaceae Everett, Bush & Andersen 1999
  - Family Rhabdochlamydiaceae Corsaro et al. 2009
  - Family Simkaniaceae Everett, Bush & Andersen 1999
  - Family Waddliaceae Rurangirwa et al. 1999

== Evolution ==
The Chlamydiota form a unique bacterial evolutionary group that separated from other bacteria about a billion years ago, and can be distinguished by the presence of several CSIs and CSPs. The species from this group can be distinguished from all other bacteria by the presence of conserved indels in a number of proteins and by large numbers of signature proteins that are uniquely present in different Chlamydiae species.

The Chlamydiota is interesting in that the order Chlamydiales (which contains all validly-published members before 2010) have no known free-living members. Considering most bacteria are free-living, there has to be some point when the lineage branched off into being intracellular. Identifying where that branch had happened and the original host remains somewhat controversial.

As of 2003 it was commonly believed that Chlamydiota shares a common ancestor with cyanobacteria, the group containing the endosymbiont ancestor to the chloroplasts of modern plants. This was due to studies showing specific genes, later entire genomic contents, to be most similar to cyanobacteria and land plants. A 2004 study found that 11% of the genes in Protochlamydia amoebophila UWE25 and 4% in the Chlamydiaceae are most similar to chloroplastic, plant, and cyanobacterial genes. In 2006, an article noted L,L-diaminopimelate aminotransferase as remarkably similar to the plant and cyanobacterial versions. An alternative, no less unusual interpretation from 2008 is that a Chlamydia might have been an endosymbioant of an ancestral plant, having transferring away some of its genes to the host before being lost.

Before the cyanobacterial hypothesis there were competing hypotheses involving Planctomycetota or Spirochaetota. The Planctomycetota theory has been present since 1987 with Cavalier-Smith's Planctobacteria. This view was almost killed off by a 2000 study showing no significant link in 23S rRNA (just like earlier 16S rRNA analyses did). James W. Molder, writing in 2003, believed that this represented the end of the Planctomycetes theory. However, growing evidence points to an actual link between these two phyla in what has since been known as the PVC superphylum. Phylogeny and shared presence of CSIs in proteins that are lineage-specific indicate that the Verrucomicrobiota are the closest free-living relatives of these parasitic organisms as of 2007.

Comparison of ribosomal RNA genes has provided a phylogeny of known strains within Chlamydiota. Trees have since been built using more loci. See § Phylogeny below.

== Phylogeny ==
16S rRNA based LTP_10_2024

- Chlamydiales
  - Simkaniaceae
  - - - Waddliaceae
      - Parachlamydiaceae
    - Chlamydiaceae

120 marker proteins based GTDB 10-RS226

- - "Similichlamydiales"
    "Parilichlamydiaceae"
  - Chlamydiales
    - - "Rhabdochlamydiaceae"
      - - - "Ca. Algichlamydia" {JAJFMI01}
          - "Ca. Amphritriteisimkania" {JACRBE01}
        - Simkaniaceae
    - - - - - Waddliaceae
            - "Criblamydiaceae"
          - Parachlamydiaceae
      - Chlamydiaceae

For the placement of taxa not found here, consult e.g. Gupta et al. (2015).

== Human pathogens and diagnostics ==
Three species of Chlamydiota that commonly infect humans are described:

- Chlamydia trachomatis, which causes the eye-disease trachoma and the sexually transmitted infection chlamydia
- Chlamydophila pneumoniae, which causes a form of pneumonia
- Chlamydophila psittaci, which causes psittacosis

The unique physiological status of the Chlamydiota including their biphasic lifecycle and obligation to replicate within a eukaryotic host has enabled the use of DNA analysis for chlamydial diagnostics. Horizontal transfer of genes is evident and complicates this area of research. In one extreme example, two genes encoding histone-like H1 proteins of eukaryotic origin have been found in the prokaryotic genome of C. trachomatis, an obligate intracellular pathogen.

== See also ==
- List of bacterial orders
- List of bacteria genera
