= Intracellular parasite =

Microparasite that grows within a host cell

Intracellular parasites are microparasites that are capable of growing and reproducing inside the cells of a host. They are also called intracellular pathogens.

== Types ==
There are two main types of intracellular parasites: Facultative and Obligate.

Facultative intracellular parasites are capable of living and reproducing in or outside of host cells. Obligate intracellular parasites, on the other hand, need a host cell to live and reproduce. Many of these types of cells require specialized host types, and invasion of host cells occurs in different ways.

=== Facultative ===
Facultative intracellular parasites are capable of living and reproducing either inside or outside cells.

Bacterial examples include:

- Bartonella henselae
- Francisella tularensis
- Listeria monocytogenes
- Salmonella Typhi
- Brucella
- Escherichia coli, specifically uropathogenic ones
- Legionella
- Mycobacterium
- Nocardia
- Neisseria
- Rhodococcus equi
- Yersinia
- Staphylococcus aureus
- Mycobacterium tuberculosis (within the macrophages)

Fungal examples include:

- Histoplasma capsulatum.
- Cryptococcus neoformans
- Blastomyces dermatitidis (Note: Only in animal study at initial stages of infection.)

=== Obligate ===
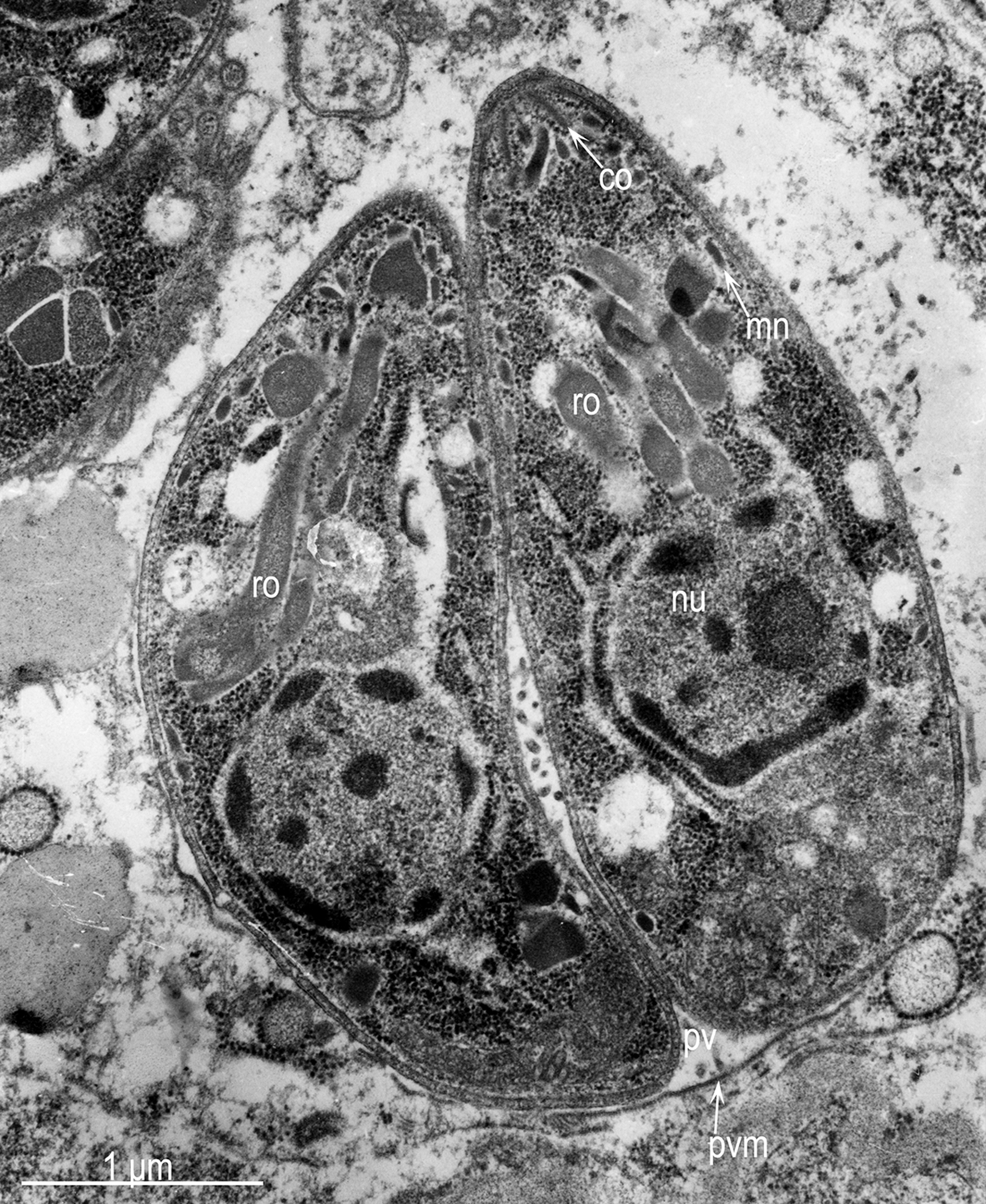
Two apicomplexans, Toxoplasma gondii, within their host cell. Transmission electron microscopy

Obligately intracellular parasites cannot reproduce outside their host cell, meaning that the parasite's reproduction is entirely reliant on intracellular resources.

All viruses are obligately intracellular parasites.

Bacterial examples (that affect humans) include:

- Chlamydia, and closely related species
- Rickettsia
- Coxiella
- Certain species of Mycobacterium such as Mycobacterium leprae, that survive in phagocytes
- Anaplasma phagocytophilum (Note: Some sources say that it's parasite, but some not.)

Protozoan examples (that affect humans) include:

- Apicomplexans (Plasmodium spp., Toxoplasma gondii and Cryptosporidium parvum)
- Trypanosomatids (Leishmania spp. and Trypanosoma cruzi)

Fungal examples (that affect humans) include:

- Pneumocystis jirovecii

The mitochondria in eukaryotic cells may also have originally been such parasites, but ended up forming a mutualistic relationship (endosymbiotic theory).

Study of obligate pathogens is difficult because they cannot usually be reproduced outside the host. However, in 2009 scientists reported a technique allowing the Q-fever pathogen Coxiella burnetii to grow in an axenic culture and suggested the technique may be useful for study of other pathogens.

=== Unusual examples ===
Polypodium is a rare metazoan (animal) intracellular parasite, distinct from most if not all other intracellular parasites for this reason. It lives inside the unfertilized egg cells (oocytes) of fish specifically sturgeons and paddlefish.

== Invasion ==
When an intracellular parasite goes to enter a host cell, it is particular about the type of host cell. This is because most intracellular parasites are able to infect only a few different cell types.

- Viruses use a number of host receptors to gain entry to the cell, usually by causing endocytosis. See viral entry for more on this well-studied topic.
- Bacteria are also generally small enough to be engulfed by endocytosis, which they trigger with adhesins. Unlike viruses, they can and often do manipulate the cell's behavior beforehand, by injecting effector proteins into the cytosol.
- Protists are generally too big to enter through endocytosis; they use alternate ways.
  - Plasmodium and Toxoplasma gondii are apicomplexans, named for the fact they have a "apical complex", used for gaining entry into the cell. The apicomplexan first moves on the cell looking for an ideal receptor. When the receptor is found, it re-orients itself so the apical complex points at the cell. It then secretes a number of proteins to form a moving junction, through which it gains entry.
  - Trypanosoma cruzi and Leishmania enter by subverting the pathways for plasma membrane repair. All nucleated cells use calcium concentration as a signal for membrane damage. T. cruzi attaches to the target cell then increases the calcium concentration inside, disrupting the actin network and triggering the repair mechanism. Lysosomes are recruited to this disruption and release their contents to the extracellular side, as a way to replenish the plasma membrane. T. cruzi take advantage of the excess membrane to form a vacuole in the host cell, gaining entry. Because this repair mechanism is universal to all cells with a nucleus, T. cruzi is not picky about the target cell type. Leishmania also uses this mechanism.
  - Leishmania can also trigger phagocytosis. It is able to withstand the degradation process the cell carries out following phagocytosis.
  - Microsporidians, which are tiny protozoans related to fungi, seems to form "polar tubes" that poke into the target cell.

Other intracellular parasites have developed different ways to enter a host cell that do not require a specific component or action from within the host cell. An example is intracellular parasites using a method called gliding motility. This is the use of an actin-myosin motor that is connected to the intracellular parasites' cytoskeleton.

== Nutrition ==
The majority of intracellular parasites must keep host cells alive as long as possible while they are reproducing and growing. In order to grow, they need nutrients that might be scarce in their free form in the cell. To study the mechanism that intracellular parasites use to obtain nutrients, Legionella pneumophila, a bacterial facultative intracellular parasite, has been used as a model. It is known that Legionella pneumophila obtains nutrients by promoting host proteasomal degradation. Self-degradation of host proteins into amino acids provides the parasite with its primary carbon and energy source.

== Susceptibility ==
People with T cell deficiencies are particularly susceptible to intracellular pathogens.

== See also ==
- Myzocytosis
- Pathogen evasion and resistance
