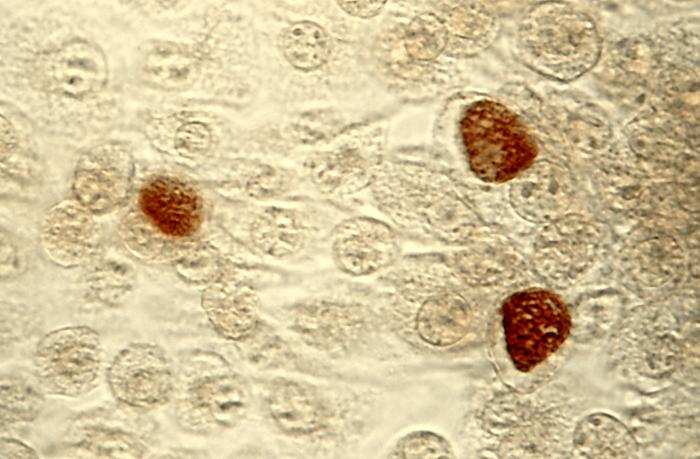
- Chlamydia trachomatis inclusion bodies (brown) in a McCoy cell culture

Scientific classification
- Domain: Bacteria
- Kingdom: Pseudomonadati
- Phylum: Chlamydiota
- Class: Chlamydiia
- Order: Chlamydiales
- Family: Chlamydiaceae; Rake 1957

Genera
- "Ca. Amphibiichlamydia"; Chlamydia; "Chlamydiifrater"; Chlamydophila; "Ca. Clavichlamydia"; "Ca. Medusoplasma"

Synonyms
- "Chlamydozoaceae" Moshkovskiy 1945; "Clavichlamydiaceae" Horn 2011; "Miyagawellidae" (sic) Levaditi, Roger & Destombes 1964

= Chlamydiaceae =

Family of bacteria

The Chlamydiaceae are a family of gram-negative bacteria that belongs to the phylum Chlamydiota, order Chlamydiales. Chlamydiaceae species express the family-specific lipopolysaccharide epitope αKdo-(2→8)-αKdo-(2→4)-αKdo (previously called the genus-specific epitope). Chlamydiaceae ribosomal RNA genes all have at least 90% DNA sequence identity. Chlamydiaceae species have varying inclusion morphology, varying extrachromosomal plasmid content, and varying sulfadiazine resistance.

The family Chlamydiaceae currently includes one genus and one candidate genus: Chlamydia and candidatus Clavochlamydia.

== Chlamydia ==
Three species belong to Chlamydia: C. trachomatis, C. muridarum, and C. suis. C. trachomatis has been found only in humans, C. muridarum in hamsters and mice (family Muridae), and C. suis in swine. Chlamydia species produce a small amount of detectable glycogen and have two ribosomal operons.

Chlamydia trachomatis is the cause of an infection commonly transmitted sexually (often referred as just "Chlamydia") and also is the cause of trachoma, an infectious eye disease, spread by eye, nose, and throat secretions.

== Phylogeny ==
The currently accepted taxonomy is based on the List of Prokaryotic names with Standing in Nomenclature (LPSN) and National Center for Biotechnology Information (NCBI).

16S rRNA based LTP_10_2024

- - "Chlamydiifrater"
  - - - Chlamydophila pecora
      - Chlamydophila pneumoniae
    - - Chlamydia
      - Chlamydophila

120 marker proteins based GTDB 10-RS226

- - "Ca. Clavichlamydia" corrig. Karlsen et al. 2008
  - - "Chlamydiifrater" Vorimore et al. 2021
    - - Chlamydia Jones, Rake & Stearns 1945
      - Chlamydophila Everett, Bush & Andersen 1999 (including C. pecora and C. pneumoniae)

== See also ==
- List of bacterial orders
- List of bacteria genera
