= Chlamydia =

Sexually transmitted bacterial infection

- Other names: Chlamydia infection
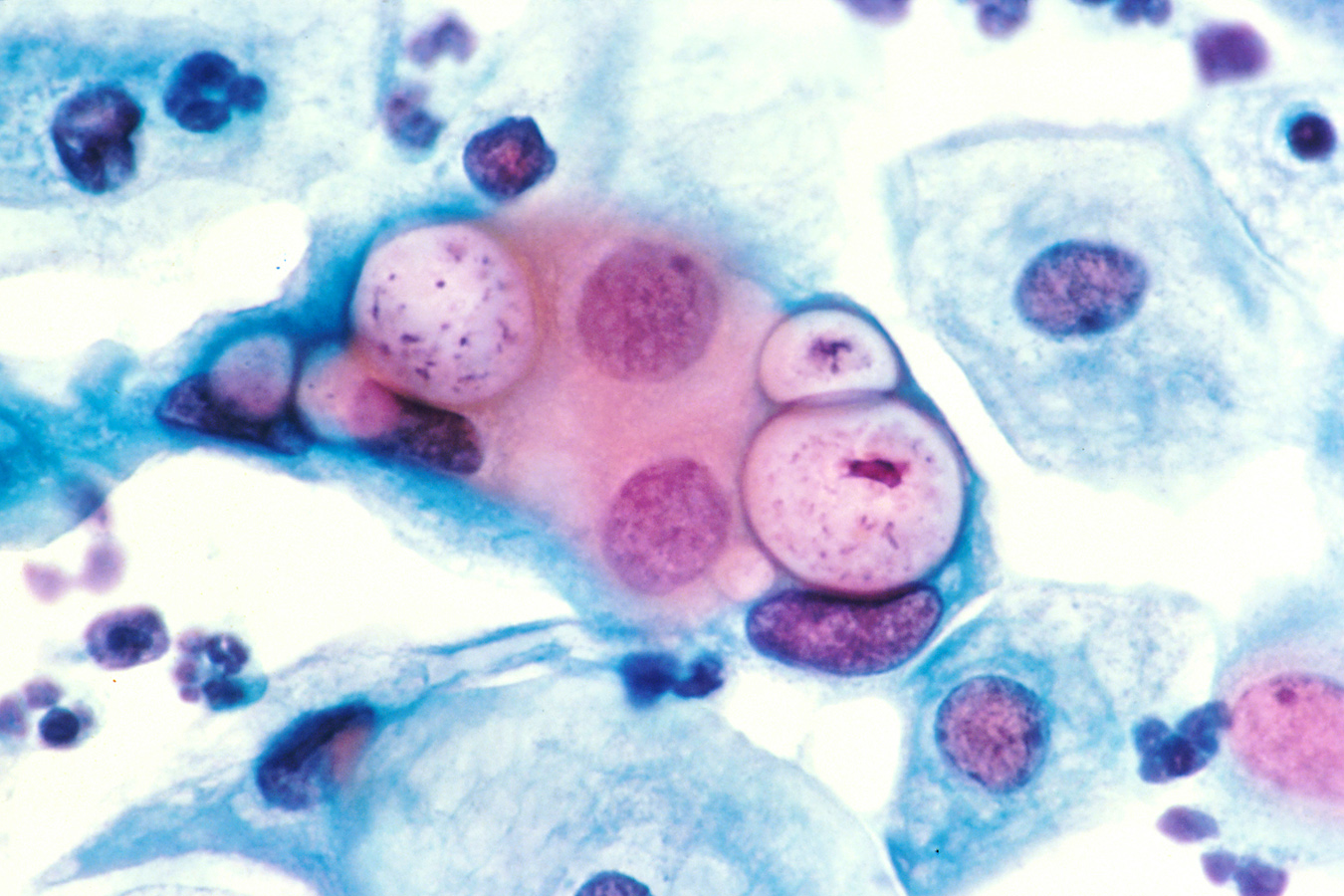
- Pap smear showing C. trachomatis (H&E stain)
- Pronunciation: /kləˈmɪdiə/, klə-MID-ee-yuh
- Specialty: Infectious disease, gynecology, urology
- Symptoms: None, vaginal discharge, discharge from the penis, burning with urination
- Complications: Pain in the testicles, pelvic inflammatory disease, infertility, ectopic pregnancy
- Usual onset: Few weeks following exposure
- Causes: Chlamydia trachomatis spread by sexual intercourse or childbirth
- Diagnostic method: Urine or swab of the cervix, vagina, or urethra
- Prevention: Not having sex, condoms, sex with only one non–infected person
- Treatment: Antibiotics (azithromycin or doxycycline)
- Frequency: 4.2% (women), 2.7% (men)
- Deaths: ~200 (2015)

Chlamydia, or more specifically a chlamydia infection, is a sexually transmitted infection caused by the bacterium Chlamydia trachomatis. Most people who are infected have no symptoms. When symptoms do appear, they may occur only several weeks after infection; the incubation period between exposure and being able to infect others is thought to be on the order of two to six weeks. Symptoms in women may include vaginal discharge or burning with urination. Symptoms in men may include discharge from the penis, burning with urination, or pain and swelling of one or both testicles. The infection can spread to the upper genital tract in women, causing pelvic inflammatory disease, which may result in future infertility or ectopic pregnancy.

Chlamydia infections can occur in other areas besides the genitals, including the anus, eyes, throat, and lymph nodes. Repeated chlamydia infections of the eyes that go without treatment can result in trachoma, a common cause of blindness in the developing world.

Chlamydia can be spread during vaginal, anal, oral, or manual sex and can be passed from an infected mother to her baby during childbirth. The eye infections may also be spread by personal contact, flies, and contaminated towels in areas with poor sanitation. Infection by the bacterium Chlamydia trachomatis only occurs in humans. Diagnosis is often by screening, which is recommended yearly in sexually active women under the age of 25, others at higher risk, and at the first prenatal visit. Testing can be done on the urine or a swab of the cervix, vagina, or urethra. Rectal or mouth swabs are required to diagnose infections in those areas.

Prevention is by not having sex, the use of condoms, or having sex with only one other person, who is not infected. Chlamydia can be cured by antibiotics, with typically either azithromycin or doxycycline being used. Erythromycin or azithromycin is recommended in babies and during pregnancy. Sexual partners should also be treated, and infected people should be advised not to have sex for seven days and until symptom free. Gonorrhea, syphilis, and HIV should be tested for in those who have been infected. Following treatment, people should be tested again after three months.

Chlamydia is one of the most common sexually transmitted infections, affecting about 4.2% of women and 2.7% of men worldwide. In 2015, about 61 million new cases occurred globally. In the United States, about 1.4 million cases were reported in 2014. Infections are most common among those between the ages of 15 and 25 and are more common in women than men. In 2015, infections resulted in about 200 deaths. The word chlamydia is from the Greek χλαμύδα, meaning 'cloak'.

== Signs and symptoms ==
=== Genital disease ===
Inflammation of the cervix from chlamydia infection characterized by mucopurulent cervical discharge, redness, and inflammation

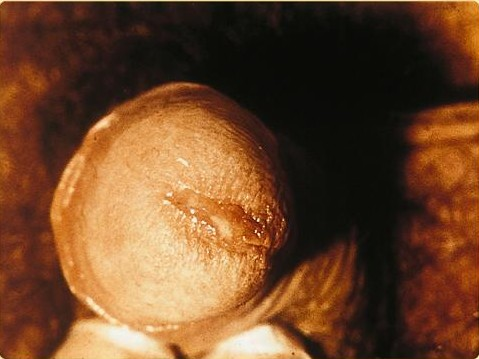
A white, cloudy or watery discharge may emerge from the tip of the penis.

==== Women ====
Chlamydial infection of the cervix (neck of the womb) is a sexually transmitted infection which has no symptoms for around 70% of women infected. The infection can be passed through vaginal, anal, oral, or manual sex. Of those who have an asymptomatic infection that is not detected by their doctor, approximately half will develop pelvic inflammatory disease (PID), a generic term for infection of the uterus, fallopian tubes, and/or ovaries. PID can cause scarring inside the reproductive organs, which can later cause serious complications, including chronic pelvic pain, difficulty becoming pregnant, ectopic (tubal) pregnancy, and other dangerous complications of pregnancy.

Chlamydia is known as the "silent epidemic", as at least 70% of genital C. trachomatis infections in women (and 50% in men) are asymptomatic at the time of diagnosis, and can linger for months or years before being discovered. Signs and symptoms may include abnormal vaginal bleeding or discharge, abdominal pain, painful sexual intercourse, fever, painful urination or the urge to urinate more often than usual (urinary urgency).

For sexually active women who are not pregnant, screening is recommended in those under 25 and others at risk of infection. Risk factors include a history of chlamydial or other sexually transmitted infection, new or multiple sexual partners, and inconsistent condom use. Guidelines recommend all women attending for emergency contraceptive are offered chlamydia testing, with studies showing up to 9% of women aged under 25 years had chlamydia.

==== Men ====
In men, those with a chlamydial infection show symptoms of infectious inflammation of the urethra in about 50% of cases. Symptoms that may occur include: a painful or burning sensation when urinating, an unusual discharge from the penis, testicular pain or swelling, or fever. If left untreated, chlamydia in men can spread to the testicles causing epididymitis, which in rare cases can lead to sterility if not treated. Chlamydia is also a potential cause of prostatic inflammation in men, although the exact relevance in prostatitis is difficult to ascertain due to possible contamination from urethritis.

=== Eye disease ===
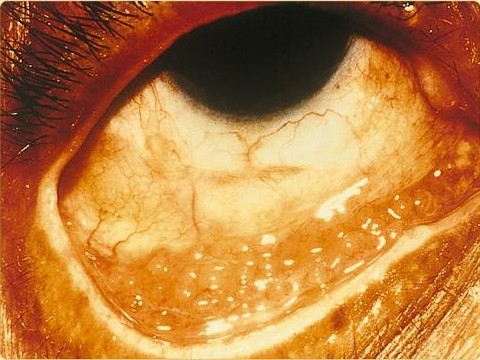
Conjunctivitis due to chlamydia

Trachoma is a chronic conjunctivitis caused by Chlamydia trachomatis. It was once the leading cause of blindness worldwide, but its role diminished from 15% of blindness cases by trachoma in 1995 to 3.6% in 2002. The infection can be spread from eye to eye by fingers, shared towels or cloths, coughing and sneezing and eye-seeking flies. Symptoms include mucopurulent ocular discharge, irritation, redness, and lid swelling. Newborns can also develop chlamydia eye infection through childbirth (see below). Using the SAFE strategy (acronym for surgery for in-growing or in-turned lashes, antibiotics, facial cleanliness, and environmental improvements), the World Health Organization aimed (unsuccessfully) for the global elimination of trachoma by 2020 (GET 2020 initiative). The updated World Health Assembly neglected tropical diseases road map (2021–2030) sets 2030 as the new timeline for global elimination.

=== Joints ===
Chlamydia may also cause reactive arthritis—the triad of arthritis, conjunctivitis and urethral inflammation—especially in young men. . It can occur in both sexes, though is more common in men, with a reported ratio of nine males cases for every one female case.

=== Infants ===
As many as half of all infants born to mothers with chlamydia will be born with the disease. Chlamydia can affect infants by causing spontaneous abortion; premature birth; conjunctivitis, which may lead to blindness; and pneumonia. Conjunctivitis due to chlamydia typically occurs one week after birth (compared with chemical causes (within hours) or gonorrhea (2–5 days)).

=== Other conditions ===
A different serovar of Chlamydia trachomatis is also the cause of lymphogranuloma venereum, an infection of the lymph nodes and lymphatics. It usually presents with genital ulceration and swollen lymph nodes in the groin, but it may also manifest as rectal inflammation, fever or swollen lymph nodes in other regions of the body.

== Transmission ==
Chlamydia can be transmitted during vaginal, anal, oral, or manual sex or direct contact with infected tissue such as conjunctiva. Chlamydia can also be passed from an infected mother to her baby during vaginal childbirth. It is assumed that the probability of becoming infected is proportionate to the number of bacteria one is exposed to.

Recent research using droplet digital PCR and viability assays found evidence of high-viability C. trachomatis in the gastrointestinal tract of women who abstained from receptive anal intercourse. Rectal C. trachomatis appeared independent of cervical infection—with distinct MLST types detected in rectal versus endocervical samples—suggesting persistent gastrointestinal colonization likely acquired through prior vaginorectal or oral routes, rather than direct anal exposure.

== Pathophysiology ==
Chlamydia bacteria have the ability to establish long-term associations with host cells. When an infected host cell is starved for various nutrients such as amino acids (for example, tryptophan), iron, or vitamins, this has a negative consequence for chlamydia bacteria since the organism is dependent on the host cell for these nutrients. Long-term cohort studies indicate that approximately 50% of those infected clear within a year, 80% within two years, and 90% within three years.

The starved chlamydia bacteria can enter a persistent growth state where they stop cell division and become morphologically aberrant by increasing in size. Persistent organisms remain viable as they are capable of returning to a normal growth state once conditions in the host cell improve.

There is debate as to whether persistence has relevance: some believe that persistent chlamydia bacteria are the cause of chronic chlamydial diseases. Some antibiotics such as β-lactams have been found to induce a persistent-like growth state.

== Diagnosis ==
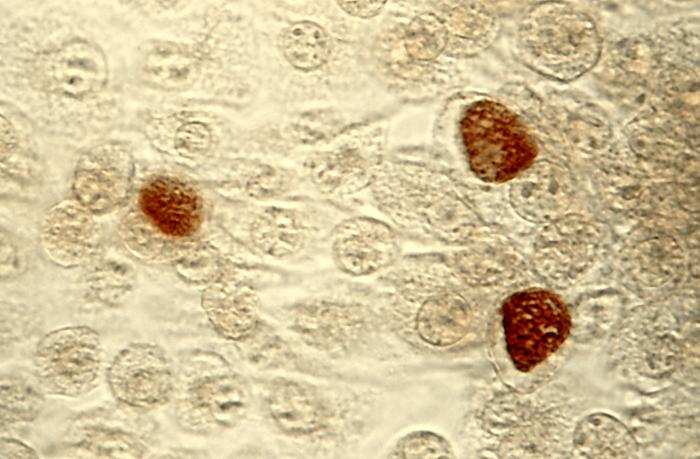
Chlamydia trachomatis inclusion bodies (brown) in a McCoy cell culture

The diagnosis of genital chlamydial infections evolved rapidly from the 1990s through 2006. Nucleic acid amplification tests (NAAT), such as polymerase chain reaction (PCR), transcription mediated amplification (TMA), and the DNA strand displacement amplification (SDA) now are the mainstays. NAAT for chlamydia may be performed on swab specimens sampled from the cervix (women) or urethra (men), on self-collected vaginal swabs, or on voided urine. NAAT has been estimated to have a sensitivity of approximately 90% and a specificity of approximately 99%, regardless of sampling from a cervical swab or by urine specimen. In women seeking treatment in a sexually transmitted infection clinic where a urine test is negative, a subsequent cervical swab has been estimated to be positive in approximately 2% of the time.

At present, the NAATs have regulatory approval only for testing urogenital specimens, although rapidly evolving research indicates that they may give reliable results on rectal specimens.

Because of improved test accuracy, ease of specimen management, convenience in specimen management, and ease of screening sexually active men and women, the NAATs have largely replaced culture, the historic gold standard for chlamydia diagnosis, and the non-amplified probe tests. The latter test is relatively insensitive, successfully detecting only 60–80% of infections in asymptomatic women, and often giving falsely-positive results. Culture remains useful in selected circumstances and is currently the only assay approved for testing non-genital specimens. Culture is also the only method that allows test of cure following antibiotic treatment. Other methods also exist including: ligase chain reaction (LCR), direct fluorescent antibody resting, enzyme immunoassay, and cell culture.

The swab sample for chlamydial infections does not show difference whether the sample was collected in home or in clinic in terms of numbers of patient treated. The implications in cured patients, reinfection, partner management, and safety are unknown.

Rapid point-of-care tests are, as of 2020, not thought to be effective for diagnosing chlamydia in men of reproductive age and non-pregnant women because of high false-negative rates.

== Prevention ==
Prevention is by not having sex, the use of condoms, or having sex only in a long-term monogamous or polyamorous relationship with partners who have been tested and confirmed not to be infected.

=== Screening ===
For sexually active women who are not pregnant, screening is recommended in those under 25 and others at risk of infection. Risk factors include a history of chlamydial or other sexually transmitted infection, new or multiple sexual partners, and inconsistent condom use. For pregnant women, guidelines vary: screening women with age or other risk factors is recommended by the U.S. Preventive Services Task Force (USPSTF) (which recommends screening women under 25) and the American Academy of Family Physicians (which recommends screening women aged 25 or younger). The American College of Obstetricians and Gynecologists recommends screening all at risk, while the Centers for Disease Control and Prevention recommend universal screening of pregnant women. The USPSTF acknowledges that in some communities there may be other risk factors for infection, such as ethnicity. Evidence-based recommendations for screening initiation, intervals and termination are currently not possible. For men, the USPSTF concludes evidence is currently insufficient to determine if regular screening of men for chlamydia is beneficial. They recommend regular screening of men who are at increased risk for HIV or syphilis infection. A Cochrane review found that the effects of screening are uncertain in terms of chlamydia transmission but that screening probably reduces the risk of pelvic inflammatory disease in women.

In the United Kingdom the National Health Service (NHS) aims to:

1. Prevent and control chlamydia infection through early detection and treatment of asymptomatic infection;
2. Reduce onward transmission to sexual partners;
3. Prevent the consequences of untreated infection;
4. Test at least 25 percent of the sexually active under 25 population annually.
5. Retest after treatment.

== Treatment ==
C. trachomatis infection can be effectively cured with antibiotics. Guidelines recommend azithromycin, doxycycline, erythromycin, levofloxacin, or ofloxacin. In men, doxycycline (100 mg twice a day for 7 days) is probably more effective than azithromycin (1 g single dose) but evidence for the relative effectiveness of antibiotics in women is very uncertain. Agents recommended during pregnancy include erythromycin or amoxicillin.

An option for treating sexual partners of those with chlamydia or gonorrhea includes patient-delivered partner therapy (PDT or PDPT), which is the practice of treating the sex partners of index cases by providing prescriptions or medications to the patient to take to their partner without the health care provider first examining the partner.

Following treatment people should be tested again after three months to check for reinfection. Test of cure may be false-positive due to the limitations of NAAT in a bacterial (rather than a viral) context, since targeted genetic material may persist in the absence of viable organisms.

== Epidemiology ==
Disability-adjusted life year (DALY) for chlamydia per 100,000 inhabitants in 2004 no data ≤10 10–20 20–30 30–40 40–50 50–60 60–70 70–80 80–90 90–100 100–110 more than 110

Globally, as of 2015, sexually transmitted chlamydia affects approximately 61 million people. It is more common in women (3.8%) than men (2.5%). In 2015 it resulted in about 200 deaths.

In the United States about 1.6 million cases were reported in 2023. The CDC estimates that if one includes unreported cases there are about 2.9 million each year. It affects around 3% of younger adults aged 18–29. African Americans have disproportionately higher rates of chlamydia compared to other racial and ethnic groups. Chlamydial infection is the most common bacterial sexually transmitted infection in the UK.

Chlamydia causes more than 250,000 cases of epididymitis in the U.S. each year. Chlamydia causes 250,000 to 500,000 cases of PID every year in the United States. Women infected with chlamydia are up to five times more likely to become infected with HIV, if exposed.

== See also ==
- Chlamydia research
