= Chlamydiales =

Scientific classification
- Domain: Bacteria
- Kingdom: Pseudomonadati
- Phylum: Chlamydiota
- Class: Chlamydiia
- Order: Chlamydiales; Storz and Page 1971

Families
- "Actinochlamydiaceae"; Chlamydiaceae; "Criblamydiaceae"; Parachlamydiaceae; "Rhabdochlamydiaceae"; Simkaniaceae; Waddliaceae

Synonyms
- "Amoebachlamydiales" Dharamshi et al. 2021; "Anoxychlamydiales" Dharamshi et al. 2019; Parachlamydiales Gupta et al. 2016; "Simkaniales" Dharamshi et al. 2021

Order of bacteria

The bacterial order Chlamydiales includes only obligately intracellular bacteria that have a chlamydia-like developmental cycle of replication and at least 80% 16S rRNA or 23S rRNA gene sequence identity with other members of Chlamydiales. Chlamydiales live in animals, insects, and protozoa.

Currently, the order Chlamydiales includes the families Chlamydiaceae, Simkaniaceae, and Waddliaceae, which have Gram-negative extracellular infectious bodies (EBs), and Parachlamydiaceae, which has variable Gram staining of EBs. The family Rhabdochlamydiaceae has been proposed.

== Phylogeny ==
The currently accepted taxonomy is based on the List of Prokaryotic names with Standing in Nomenclature (LPSN) and National Center for Biotechnology Information (NCBI).

16S rRNA based LTP_10_2024

- - Simkaniaceae
  - - - Waddliaceae
      - Parachlamydiaceae
    - Chlamydiaceae

120 marker proteins based GTDB 10-RS226

- - - "Rhabdochlamydiaceae" Corsaro et al. 2009
    - - - "Ca. Algichlamydia" {JAJFMI01}
        - "Ca. Amphritriteisimkania" {JACRBE01}
      - Simkaniaceae Everett, Bush & Andersen 1999
  - - - - Waddliaceae Rurangirwa et al. 1999
        - "Criblamydiaceae" Thomas, Casson & Greub 2006
      - Parachlamydiaceae Everett, Bush & Andersen 1999
    - Chlamydiaceae Rake 1957

== See also ==
- List of bacterial orders
- List of bacteria genera
