= Azalide =

Class of antibiotics

Azithromycin

Azalides are a class of macrolide antibiotics that were originally manufactured in response to the poor acid stability exhibited by original macrolides such as erythromycin. Examples of azalides include azithromycin, which is used in humans, while tulathromycin and gamithromycin are used in veterinary medicine. Following the clinical overuse of macrolides and azalides, ketolides have been developed to combat surfacing macrolide-azalide resistance among streptococci species. Azalides have several advantages over erythromycin such as more potent gram negative antimicrobial activity, acid stability, and side effect tolerability. Although there are few drug interactions with azithromycin, it weakly inhibits the CYP3A4 enzyme.

== Structure ==
Azalides feature a nitrogen atom in their 15-membered macrolide ring, resulting in improved pharmacokinetic properties and greater stability when compared to earlier-generation macrolides. Replacement of the ketone group in traditional macrolides with a tertiary amine group confers greater acid stability. See Beckmann rearrangement.

== Mechanism of action ==
Azalides bind to the bacterial 50S ribosomal subunit and inhibit polypeptide elongation by hindering peptidyl transfer RNA translocation.

== Pharmacokinetics ==
Applicable pharmacokinetic indexes are free azalide AUC_{24}/MIC because of the post antibiotic effect they exhibit, and free azalide concentration/MIC. Due to their large volume of distribution and lipophilic structure, azalides concentrate effectively in tissue.
