= Gamithromycin =

Medication

Clinical data
- Trade names: Zactran
- Other names: ML-1709460, ML-460
- License data: US DailyMed: Gamithromycin
- Routes of administration: Subcutaneous
- Drug class: Macrolide antibiotic
- ATCvet code: QJ01FA95 (WHO)

Legal status
- Legal status: US: ℞-only; EU: Rx-only

Identifiers
- IUPAC name: (2R,3S,4R,5S,8R,10R,11R,12S,13S,14R)-11-{[(2S,3R,4S,6R)-4-(dimethylamino)-3-hydroxy-6-methyloxan-2-yl]oxy}-2-ethyl-3,4,10-trihydroxy-13-{[(2R,4R,5S,6S)-5-hydroxy-4-methoxy-4,6-dimethyloxan-2-yl]oxy}-3,5,8,10,12,14-hexamethyl-7-propyl-1-oxa-7-azacyclopentadecan-15-one
- CAS Number: 145435-72-9
- PubChem CID: 59364992
- DrugBank: DB11416
- ChemSpider: 28530824
- UNII: ZE856183S0
- KEGG: D06598
- ChEBI: CHEBI:195437
- ChEMBL: ChEMBL2107342
- CompTox Dashboard (EPA): DTXSID90904260
- ECHA InfoCard: 100.123.704

Chemical and physical data
- Formula: C_{40}H_{76}N_{2}O_{12}
- Molar mass: 777.050 g·mol^{−1}
- 3D model (JSmol): Interactive image
- SMILES: [H][C@@]1(C[C@@](C)(OC)[C@@H](O)[C@H](C)O1)O[C@H]1[C@H](C)[C@@H](O[C@]2([H])O[C@H](C)C[C@@H]([C@H]2O)N(C)C)[C@](C)(O)C[C@@H](C)N(CCC)C[C@H](C)[C@@H](O)[C@](C)(O)[C@@H](CC)OC(=O)[C@@H]1C
- InChI: InChI=1S/C40H76N2O12/c1-15-17-42-21-22(3)33(44)40(11,48)29(16-2)52-36(46)26(7)32(53-30-20-39(10,49-14)34(45)27(8)51-30)25(6)35(38(9,47)19-23(42)4)54-37-31(43)28(41(12)13)18-24(5)50-37/h22-35,37,43-45,47-48H,15-21H2,1-14H3/t22-,23+,24+,25-,26+,27-,28-,29+,30-,31+,32-,33+,34-,35+,37-,38+,39+,40+/m0/s1; Key:VWAMTBXLZPEDQO-UZSBJOJWSA-N

Gamithromycin, sold under the brand name Zactran, is a veterinary medication used for the treatment of cattle, pigs, and sheep. It is an azalide antibacterial related to azithromycin.

It was approved for veterinary use in the European Union in 2008.

== Veterinary uses ==
In the EU, gamithromycin is indicated for the treatment and prevention of bovine respiratory disease in cattle, swine respiratory disease in pigs, and infectious pododermatitis (foot rot) in sheep.

In the US, gamithromycin is indicated for the treatment of bovine respiratory disease in cattle.
