= C8H17NO3 =

List of chemical structure articles associated with the same molecular formula

The molecular formula C_{8}H_{17}NO_{3} may refer to:

- Desosamine
- Statine
