= Diffuse panbronchiolitis =

Inflammatory lung disease

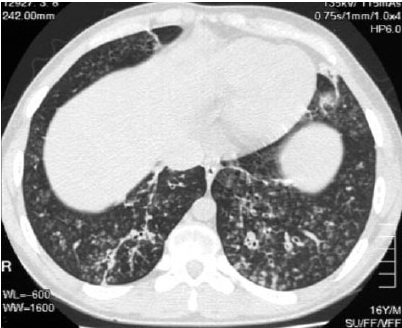
- High-resolution computed tomography images of the lower chest in a 16-year-old boy with diffuse panbronchiolitis
- Specialty: Pulmonology

Diffuse panbronchiolitis (DPB) is an inflammatory lung disease of unknown cause. It is a severe, progressive form of bronchiolitis, an inflammatory condition of the bronchioles (small air passages in the lungs). The term diffuse signifies that lesions appear throughout both lungs, while panbronchiolitis refers to inflammation found in all layers of the respiratory bronchioles (those involved in gas exchange). DPB causes severe inflammation and nodule-like lesions of terminal bronchioles, chronic sinusitis, and intense coughing with large amounts of sputum production.

The disease is believed to occur when there is susceptibility, or a lack of immune system resistance, to DPB-causing bacteria or viruses, caused by several genes that are found predominantly in individuals of East Asian descent. The highest incidence occurs among Japanese people, followed by Koreans. DPB occurs more often in males and usually begins around age 40. It was recognized as a distinct new disease in the early 1960s and was formally named diffuse panbronchiolitis in 1969.

If left untreated, DPB progresses to bronchiectasis, an irreversible lung condition that involves enlargement of the bronchioles, and pooling of mucus in the bronchiolar passages. Daily treatment of DPB with macrolide antibiotics such as erythromycin eases symptoms and increases survival time, but the disease currently has no known cure. The eventual result of DPB can be respiratory failure and heart problems.

== Classification ==
The term "bronchiolitis" generally refers to inflammation of the bronchioles. DPB is classified as a form of "primary bronchiolitis", which means that the underlying cause of bronchiolitis is originating from or is confined to the bronchioles. Along with DPB, additional forms of primary bronchiolitis include bronchiolitis obliterans, follicular bronchiolitis, respiratory bronchiolitis, mineral dust airway disease, and a number of others. Unlike DPB, bronchiolitis that is not considered "primary" would be associated with diseases of the larger airways, such as chronic bronchitis.

== Signs and symptoms ==
Symptoms of DPB include chronic sinusitis (inflamed paranasal sinuses), wheezing, crackles (respiratory sounds made by obstructions such as phlegm and secretions in the lungs), dyspnea (shortness of breath), and a severe cough that yields large amounts of sputum (coughed-up phlegm). There may be pus in the sputum, and affected individuals may have fever. Typical signs of DPB progression include dilation (enlargement) of the bronchiolar passages and hypoxemia (low levels of oxygen in the blood). If DPB is left untreated, bronchiectasis will occur; it is characterized by dilation and thickening of the walls of the bronchioles, inflammatory damage to respiratory and terminal bronchioles, and pooling of mucus in the lungs. DPB is associated with progressive respiratory failure, hypercapnia (increased levels of carbon dioxide in the blood), and can eventually lead to pulmonary hypertension (high blood pressure in the pulmonary vein and artery) and cor pulmonale (dilation of the right ventricle of the heart, or "right heart failure").

== Cause ==
The genes for human HLA are located on chromosome 6.

DPB is idiopathic, which means an exact physiological, environmental, or pathogenic cause of the disease is unknown. However, several factors are suspected to be involved with its pathogenesis (the way in which the disease works).

The major histocompatibility complex (MHC) is a large genomic region found in most vertebrates that is associated with the immune system. It is located on chromosome 6 in humans. A subset of MHC in humans is human leukocyte antigen (HLA), which controls the antigen-presenting system, as part of adaptive immunity against pathogens such as bacteria and viruses. When human cells are infected by a pathogen, some of them can present parts of the pathogen's proteins on their surfaces; this is called "antigen presentation". The infected cells then become targets for types of cytotoxic T-cells, which kill the infected cells so they can be removed from the body.

Genetic predisposition for DPB susceptibility has been localized to two HLA haplotypes (a nucleotide or gene sequence difference between paired chromosomes, that is more likely to occur among a common ethnicity or trait) common to people of East Asian descent. HLA-B54 is associated with DPB in the Japanese, while HLA-A11 is associated with the disease in Koreans. Several genes within this region of class I HLA are believed to be responsible for DPB, by allowing increased susceptibility to the disease. The common genetic background and similarities in the HLA profile of affected Japanese and Korean individuals were considered in the search for a DPB gene. It was suggested that a mutation of a suspected disease-susceptibility gene located somewhere between HLA-B and HLA-A had occurred on an ancestral chromosome carrying both HLA-B54 and HLA-A11. Further, it is possible that a number of genetic recombination events around the disease locus (location on a chromosome) could have resulted in the disease being associated with HLA-B54 in the Japanese and HLA-A11 in Koreans. After further study, it was concluded that a DPB susceptibility gene is located near the HLA-B locus at chromosome 6p21.3. Within this area, the search for a genetic cause of the disease has continued.

Because many genes belonging to HLA remain unidentified, positional cloning (a method used to identify a specific gene, when only its location on a chromosome is known) has been used to determine that a mucin-like gene is associated with DPB. In addition, diseases caused by identified HLA genes in the DPB-susceptibility region have been investigated. One of these, bare lymphocyte syndrome I (BLS I), exhibits a number of similarities with DPB in those affected, including chronic sinusitis, bronchiolar inflammation and nodules, and the presence of H. influenzae. Also like DPB, BLS I responds favorably to erythromycin therapy by showing a resolution of symptoms. The similarities between these two diseases, the corresponding success with the same mode of treatment, and the fact that the gene responsible for BLS I is located within the DPB-causing area of HLA narrows the establishment of a gene responsible for DPB. Environmental factors such as inhaling toxic fumes and cigarette smoking are not believed to play a role in DPB, and unknown environmental and other non-genetic causes—such as unidentified bacteria or viruses—have not been ruled out.

Cystic fibrosis (CF), a progressive multi-system lung disease, has been considered in the search for a genetic cause of DPB. This is for a number of reasons. CF, like DPB, causes severe lung inflammation, abundant mucus production, infection, and shows a genetic predominance among Caucasians of one geographic group to the rarity of others; whereas DPB dominates among East Asians, CF mainly affects individuals of European descent. While no gene has been implicated as the cause of DPB, mutation in a specific gene—much more likely to occur in Europeans—causes CF. This mutation in the CF-causing gene is not a factor in DPB, but a unique polymorphism (variation) in this gene is known to occur in many Asians not necessarily affected by either disease. It is being investigated whether this gene in any state of mutation could contribute to DPB.

== Pathophysiology ==
Inflammation is a normal part of the human immune response, whereby leukocytes (white blood cells), including neutrophils (white blood cells that specialize in causing inflammation), gather, and chemokines (proteins released from certain cells, which activate or elicit a response from other cells) accumulate at any location in the body where bacterial or viral infections occur. Inflammation interferes with the activity of bacteria and viruses, and serves to clear them from the body. In DPB, bacteria such as Haemophilus influenzae and Pseudomonas aeruginosa can cause the proliferation of inflammatory cells into the bronchiolar tissues. However, when neither bacteria are present with DPB, the inflammation continues for an as yet unknown reason. In either circumstance, inflammation in DPB can be so severe that nodules containing inflammatory cells form in the walls of the bronchioles. The presence of inflammation and infection in the airways also results in the production of excess mucus, which must be coughed up as sputum. The combination of inflammation, nodule development, infection, mucus, and frequent cough contributes to the breathing difficulties in DPB.

The fact that inflammation in DPB persists with or without the presence of P. aeruginosa and H. influenzae provides a means to determine several mechanisms of DPB pathogenesis. Leukotrienes are eicosanoids, signaling molecules made from essential fatty acids, which play a role in many lung diseases by causing the proliferation of inflammatory cells and excess mucus production in the airways. In DPB and other lung diseases, the predominant mediator of neutrophil-related inflammation is leukotriene B4, which specializes in neutrophil proliferation via chemotaxis (the movement of some types of cells toward or away from certain molecules).

Inflammation in DPB is also caused by the chemokine MIP-1alpha and its involvement with CD8^{+} T cells. Beta defensins, a family of antimicrobial peptides found in the respiratory tract, are responsible for further inflammation in DPB when a pathogen such as P. aeruginosa is present. If present with DPB, the human T-lymphotropic virus, type I, a retrovirus, modifies DPB pathogenesis by infecting T helper cells and altering their effectiveness in recognizing the presence of known or unknown pathogens involved with DPB.

== Diagnosis ==
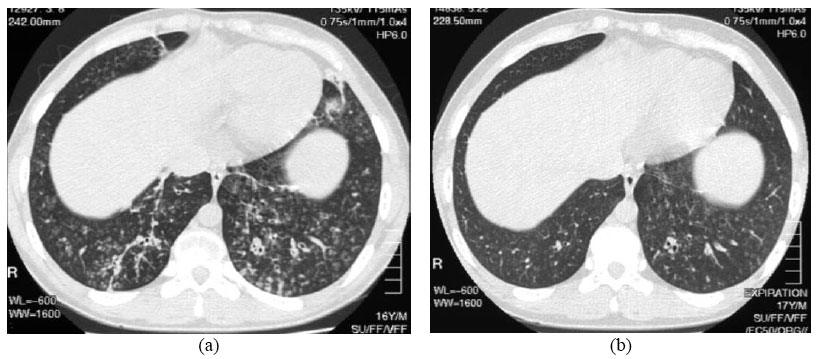
High resolution computed tomography (HRCT) images of the lower chest in a 16-year-old boy initially diagnosed with DPB (left), and 8 weeks later (right) after a 6-week course of treatment with erythromycin. The bilateral bronchiectasis and prominent centri-lobular nodules with a "tree-in-bud" pattern shows noticeable improvement.

The diagnosis of DPB requires analysis of the lungs and bronchiolar tissues, which can require a lung biopsy, or the more preferred high resolution computed tomography (HRCT) scan of the lungs. The diagnostic criteria include severe inflammation in all layers of the respiratory bronchioles and lung tissue lesions that appear as nodules within the terminal and respiratory bronchioles in both lungs. The nodules in DPB appear as opaque lumps when viewed on X-rays of the lung, and can cause airway obstruction, which is evaluated by a pulmonary function test, or PFT. Lung X-rays can also reveal dilation of the bronchiolar passages, another sign of DPB. HRCT scans often show blockages of some bronchiolar passages with mucus, which is referred to as the "tree-in-bud" pattern. Hypoxemia, another sign of breathing difficulty, is revealed by measuring the oxygen and carbon dioxide content of the blood, using a blood test called arterial blood gas. Other findings observed with DPB include the proliferation of lymphocytes (white blood cells that fight infection), neutrophils, and foamy histiocytes (tissue macrophages) in the lung lining. Bacteria such as H. influenzae and P. aeruginosa are also detectable, with the latter becoming more prominent as the disease progresses. The white blood, bacterial and other cellular content of the blood can be measured by taking a complete blood count (CBC). Elevated levels of IgG and IgA (classes of immunoglobulins) may be seen, as well as the presence of rheumatoid factor (an indicator of autoimmunity). Hemagglutination, a clumping of red blood cells in response to the presence of antibodies in the blood, may also occur. Neutrophils, beta-defensins, leukotrienes, and chemokines can also be detected in bronchoalveolar lavage fluid injected then removed from the bronchiolar airways of individuals with DPB, for evaluation.

=== Differential diagnosis ===
In the differential diagnosis (finding the correct diagnosis between diseases that have overlapping features) of some obstructive lung diseases, DPB is often considered. A number of DPB symptoms resemble those found with other obstructive lung diseases such as asthma, chronic bronchitis, and emphysema. Wheezing, coughing with sputum production, and shortness of breath are common symptoms in such diseases, and obstructive respiratory functional impairment is found on pulmonary function testing. Cystic fibrosis, like DPB, causes severe lung inflammation, excess mucus production, and infection; but DPB does not cause disturbances of the pancreas nor the electrolytes, as does CF, so the two diseases are different and probably unrelated. DPB is distinguished by the presence of lesions that appear on X-rays as nodules in the bronchioles of both lungs; inflammation in all tissue layers of the respiratory bronchioles; and its higher prevalence among individuals with East Asian lineage.

DPB and bronchiolitis obliterans are two forms of primary bronchiolitis. Specific overlapping features of both diseases include strong cough with large amounts of often pus-filled sputum; nodules viewable on lung X-rays in the lower bronchi and bronchiolar area; and chronic sinusitis. In DPB, the nodules are more restricted to the respiratory bronchioles, while in OB they are often found in the membranous bronchioles (the initial non-cartilaginous section of the bronchiole, that divides from the tertiary bronchus) up to the secondary bronchus. OB is a bronchiolar disease with worldwide prevalence, while DPB has more localized prevalence, predominantly in Japan. Prior to clinical recognition of DPB in recent years, it was often misdiagnosed as bronchiectasia, COPD, IPF, phthisis miliaris, sarcoidosis or alveolar cell carcinoma.

== Treatment ==
Molecular structure of Erythromycin A, an antibiotic used to treat DPB

Macrolide antibiotics, such as erythromycin, are an effective treatment for DPB when taken regularly over an extended period of time. Clarithromycin or roxithromycin are also commonly used. The successful results of macrolides in DPB and similar lung diseases stems from managing certain symptoms through immunomodulation (adjusting the immune response), which can be achieved by taking the antibiotics in low doses. Treatment consists of daily oral administration of erythromycin for two to three years, an extended period that has been shown to dramatically improve the effects of DPB. This is apparent when an individual undergoing treatment for DPB, among a number of disease-related remission criteria, has a normal neutrophil count detected in BAL fluid, and blood gas (an arterial blood test that measures the amount of oxygen and carbon dioxide in the blood) readings show that free oxygen in the blood is within the normal range. Allowing a temporary break from erythromycin therapy in these instances has been suggested, to reduce the formation of macrolide-resistant P. aeruginosa. However, DPB symptoms usually return, and treatment would need to be resumed. Although highly effective, erythromycin may not prove successful in all individuals with the disease, particularly if macrolide-resistant P. aeruginosa is present or previously untreated DPB has progressed to the point where respiratory failure is occurring.

With erythromycin therapy in DPB, great reduction in bronchiolar inflammation and damage is achieved through suppression of not only neutrophil proliferation, but also lymphocyte activity and obstructive mucus and water secretions in airways. The antibiotic effects of macrolides are not involved in their beneficial effects toward reducing inflammation in DPB. This is evident because the treatment dosage is much too low to fight infection, and in DPB cases with the occurrence of macrolide-resistant P. aeruginosa, erythromycin therapy still reduces inflammation.

A number of factors are involved in suppression of inflammation by erythromycin and other macrolides. They are especially effective at inhibiting the proliferation of neutrophils, by diminishing the ability of interleukin 8 and leukotriene B4 to attract them. Macrolides also reduce the efficiency of adhesion molecules that allow neutrophils to stick to bronchiolar tissue linings. Mucus production in the airways is a major culprit in the morbidity and mortality of DPB and other respiratory diseases. The significant reduction of inflammation in DPB attributed to erythromycin therapy also helps to inhibit the production of excess mucus.

== Prognosis ==
Untreated DPB leads to bronchiectasis, respiratory failure, and death. A journal report from 1983 indicated that untreated DPB had a five-year survival rate of 62.1%, while the 10-year survival rate was 33.2%. With erythromycin treatment, individuals with DPB now have a much longer life expectancy due to better management of symptoms, delay of progression, and prevention of associated infections like P. aeruginosa. The 10-year survival rate for treated DPB is about 90%. In DPB cases where treatment has resulted in significant improvement, which sometimes happens after about two years, treatment has been allowed to end for a while. However, individuals allowed to stop treatment during this time are closely monitored. As DPB has been proven to recur, erythromycin therapy must be promptly resumed once disease symptoms begin to reappear. In spite of the improved prognosis when treated, DPB currently has no known cure.

== Epidemiology ==
DPB has its highest prevalence among the Japanese, at 11 per 100,000 population. Korean, Chinese, and Thai individuals with the disease have been reported as well. A genetic predisposition among East Asians is suggested. The disease is more common in males, with the male to female ratio at 1.4–2:1 (or about 5 men to 3 women). The average onset of the disease is around age 40, and two-thirds of those affected are non-smokers, although smoking is not believed to be a cause. The presence of HLA-Bw54 increases the risk of diffuse panbronchiolitis 13.3-fold.

In Europe and the Americas, a relatively small number of DPB cases have been reported in Asian immigrants and residents, as well as in individuals of non-Asian ancestry. Misdiagnosis has occurred in the West owing to less recognition of the disease than in Asian countries. Relative to the large number of Asians living in the west, the small number of them thought to be affected by DPB suggests non-genetic factors may play some role in its cause. This rarity seen in Western Asians may also be partly associated with misdiagnosis.

== History ==
In the early 1960s, a relatively new chronic lung disease was being observed and described by physicians in Japan. In 1969, the name "diffuse panbronchiolitis" was introduced to distinguish it from chronic bronchitis, emphysema, alveolitis, and other obstructive lung disease with inflammation. Between 1978 and 1980, the results of a nationwide survey initiated by the Ministry of Health and Welfare of Japan revealed more than 1,000 probable cases of DPB, with 82 histologically confirmed. By the 1980s, it was internationally recognized as a distinct disease of the lungs.

Before the 1980s, the prognosis or expected outcome of DPB was poor, especially in cases with superinfection (the emergence of a new viral or bacterial infection, in addition to the currently occurring infection) by P. aeruginosa. DPB continued to have a very high mortality rate before generalized antibiotic treatment and oxygen therapy were beginning to be used routinely in the effort to manage symptoms. Around 1985, when long-term treatment with the antibiotic erythromycin became the standard for managing DPB, the prognosis significantly improved. In 1990, the association of DPB with HLA was initially asserted.
