= C8H16O4 =

The molecular formula C_{8}H_{16}O_{4} (molar mass: 176.21 g/mol, exact mass: 176.104859 u) may refer to:

- 12-Crown-4, or 1,4,7,10-tetraoxacyclododecane
- Cladinose
- Metaldehyde
