= Atypical bacteria =

Bacteria unaffected by Gram stain

Atypical bacteria are bacteria that do not get colored by Gram-staining but rather remain colorless: they are neither gram-positive nor gram-negative. These include the Chlamydiaceae, Legionella and the Mycoplasmataceae (including mycoplasma and ureaplasma); the Spirochetes and Rickettsiaceae are also often considered atypical.

Gram-positive bacteria have a thick peptidoglycan layer in their cell wall, which retains the crystal violet during Gram staining, resulting in a purple color. Gram-negative bacteria have a thin peptidoglycan layer which does not retain the crystal violet, so when safranin is added during the process, they stain red.

The Mycoplasmataceae lack a peptidoglycan layer so do not retain crystal violet or safranin, resulting in no color. The Chlamydiaceae contain an extremely thin peptidoglycan layer, preventing visible staining. Ricketsiaceae are technically Gram-negative, but are too small to stain well, so are often considered atypical.

Peptidoglycans are the site of action of beta-lactam antibiotics such as penicillins and cephalosporins, so mycoplasma are naturally resistant to these drugs, which in this sense also makes them “atypical” in the treatment of their infections. Macrolides, such as erythromycin, are usually effective in treating atypical bacterial infections.

Finally, some of these bacteria can cause a specific type of pneumonia referred to as atypical pneumonia. That is not to say that atypical pneumonia is strictly caused by atypical bacteria, for this disease can also have a fungal, protozoan or viral cause.

Through a recent study on analyzing synergistic interactions between the influenza viruses and atypical bacteria, it was stated that there have been findings of interaction between the two most prominent strains C. Pneumoniae and M. Pneumoniae with the influenza virus. This was labeled and discussed as a coinfection in correlation to the influenza virus.

== See also ==
- Gram-negative bacteria
- Gram-positive bacteria
