= Solithromycin =

Chemical compound

Clinical data
- Trade names: Solithera
- Other names: CEM-101; OP-1068
- Routes of administration: Oral, intravenous
- ATC code: J01FA16 (WHO)

Legal status
- Legal status: Under FDA and EMA review for approval

Identifiers
- IUPAC name: (3aS,4R,7S,9R,10R,11R,13R,15R,15aR)-1-[4-[4-(3-aminophenyl)-1H-1,2,3-triazol-1-yl]butyl]-4-ethyl-7-fluorooctahydro-11-methoxy-3a,7,9,11,13,15-hexamethyl-10-{[3,4,6-trideoxy-3-(dimethylamino)-β-D-xylo-hexopyranosyl]oxy}-2H-Oxacyclotetradecino[4,3-d]oxazole-2,6,8,14(1H,7H,9H)-tetrone
- CAS Number: 760981-83-7
- DrugBank: DB09308
- ChemSpider: 25056854
- UNII: 9U1ETH79CK
- KEGG: D09965
- ChEMBL: ChEMBL1240704

Chemical and physical data
- Formula: C_{43}H_{65}FN_{6}O_{10}
- Molar mass: 845.023 g·mol^{−1}
- 3D model (JSmol): Interactive image
- SMILES: CC[C@@H]1[C@@]2([C@@H]([C@H](C(=O)[C@@H](C[C@@]([C@@H]([C@H](C(=O)[C@](C(=O)O1)(C)F)C)O[C@H]3[C@@H]([C@H](C[C@H](O3)C)N(C)C)O)(C)OC)C)C)N(C(=O)O2)CCCCn4cc(nn4)c5cccc(c5)N)C
- InChI: InChI=1S/C43H65FN6O10/c1-12-32-43(8)35(50(40(55)60-43)19-14-13-18-49-23-30(46-47-49)28-16-15-17-29(45)21-28)26(4)33(51)24(2)22-41(6,56-11)37(27(5)36(53)42(7,44)39(54)58-32)59-38-34(52)31(48(9)10)20-25(3)57-38/h15-17,21,23-27,31-32,34-35,37-38,52H,12-14,18-20,22,45H2,1-11H3/t24-,25-,26+,27+,31+,32-,34-,35-,37-,38+,41-,42+,43-/m1/s1; Key:IXXFZUPTQVDPPK-ZAWHAJPISA-N

Solithromycin (trade name Solithera) is a ketolide antibiotic undergoing clinical development for the treatment of community-acquired pneumonia and other infections.

Solithromycin exhibits excellent in vitro activity against a broad spectrum of Gram-positive respiratory tract pathogens, including macrolide-resistant strains. Solithromycin has activity against most common respiratory Gram-positive and fastidious Gram-negative pathogens, and is being evaluated for its utility in treating gonorrhea.

== Pre-clinical studies ==
An in vivo pre-clinical study performed by Jeffrey Keelan done in sheep may provide a prophylactic approach for intrauterine infections during pregnancy. This study was carried out by administering solithromycin to pregnant sheep, resulting in effective concentrations greater than 30 ng/ml in the fetal plasma, maternal plasma and amniotic fluid. A single maternal dose maintained these concentrations for over 12 hours.

== Clinical trials ==
- May 2011: solithromycin is in a Phase 2 clinical trial for serious community-acquired bacterial pneumonia and in a Phase 1 clinical trial with an intravenous formulation.
- September 2011: solithromycin demonstrated comparable efficacy to levofloxacin with reduced adverse events in Phase 2 trial in people with community-acquired pneumonia
- January 2015: in a Phase 3 clinical trial for community-acquired bacterial pneumonia, solithromycin administered orally demonstrated statistical non-inferiority to the fluoroquinolone moxifloxacin.
- July 2015: patient enrollment for the second Phase 3 clinical trial (Solitaire IV) for community-acquired bacterial pneumonia was completed with results expected in Q4 2015.
- Oct 2015: IV to oral solithromycin demonstrated statistical non-inferiority to IV to oral moxifloxacin in adults with community-acquired bacterial pneumonia.
- July 2016: Cempra announced FDA acceptance of IV and oral formulations of Solithera (solithromycin) new drug applications for the treatment of community-acquired bacterial pneumonia.

== Structure ==
X-ray crystallography studies have shown solithromycin, the first fluoroketolide in clinical development, has a third region of interactions with the bacterial ribosome, as compared with two binding sites for other ketolides.

The only previously marketed ketolide, telithromycin, suffers from rare but serious side effects. Recent studies have shown this to be likely due to the presence of the pyridine-imidazole group of the telithromycin side chain acting as an antagonist towards various nicotinic acetylcholine receptors. Solithromycin differs from telithromycin because the side chain does not significantly antagonize nicotinic acetylcholine receptors. Instead of the pyridine-imidazole group used on telithromycin, this molecule has a triazole-phenylamine moiety.

== Mechanism of action ==
Solithromycin inhibits bacterial translation by binding to the 23S ribosomal RNA, preventing the offending bacteria from synthesizing proteins.

== Side effects ==
During a clinical study some patients presented with elevated liver enzyme which may or may not be indicative of hepatotoxicity. This prompted the FDA Antimicrobial Drugs Advisory Committee to vote that the risk to the liver has not been adequately characterized and that further studies need to be conducted. To this extent, the FDA requests a 9,000 patient safety trial as well as restricting the drug.

== Development ==
In 2008, investigational new drug applications for solithromycin capsules and an intravenous formulation were submitted. From studies of pharmacokinetics, safety, and efficacy several issues were found. There is variable absorption which can result in subtherapeutic drug concentrations and even therapy failure. Additionally, there are significant drug-drug interactions affecting solithromycin concentrations as well the concentrations of the offending drugs. There is also a narrow therapeutic margin which can make this drug challenging to dose.

== Commercial aspects ==
Cempra's general plan is to develop solithromycin develop products through late stage clinical trials and sell them to their hospital based sales force or through partnerships, which would need negotiations with larger pharmaceutical companies. There are several manufacturing plants used such as Wockhardt Limited and Hospira Incorporated manufacturing facilities as well as Uquifa Laboratories, an alternative GMP facility.

== Intellectual property ==
Due to the fact that bringing new products to the market takes a significant investment of time and money, companies place considerable importance on patent protection for new products. Solithromycin is a new chemical entity from the macrolide library of compounds that were licensed by Optimer. It is covered by a series of patents and patent applications which claim the composition of matter of solithromycin. There are also patents surrounding the synthesis and purification of this substance. For example, patent EP3190122 A1 presents a novel, efficient route of synthesis that bypasses the need for chromatographic purification which saves time.
