= Erythromycin breath test =

Method used to measure metabolism

- Purpose: measure oxidation and elimination from the system

The erythromycin breath test (ERMBT) is a method used to measure metabolism (oxidation and elimination from the system) by a part of the cytochrome P450 system. Erythromycin produces ^{14}CO_{2,} and this ^{14}CO_{2} can be measured to study drugs that interact with the cytochrome P450 system. Erythromycin is tagged with carbon-14 and given as an intravenous injection; after 20 minutes the subject blows up a balloon and the carbon dioxide exhaled that is tagged with carbon-14 shows the activity of the CYP3A4 isoenzyme on the erythromycin. ERMBT can be used to determine how drugs that the CYP3A4 isoenzyme metabolizes will function in a given individual. The ERMBT has been widely used and verified as a reliable method for measuring CYP3A activity in real time. Its non-invasive nature makes it useful for researching drug interactions and personalizing medicine dose for drugs metabolized by CYP3A. However, its results can vary in different clinical circumstances, emphasizing the difficulty of properly predicting drug metabolism and release.

The erythromycin breath test requires an intravenous injection of [14C-N-methyl]-erythromycin dissolved in a dextrose solution. After the injection, the patient exhales into a collection bag for 20 minutes before being bubbled through a solution containing hyamine hydroxide and a blue indicator. The blue tint fades after the solution has trapped enough carbon dioxide, indicating that it is ready for analysis. The obtained 14CO₂ is then analyzed using scintillation counting to determine the activity of the CYP3A4 enzyme in the liver.

Erythromycin is a drug that treats bacterial infections like bronchitis, sexually transmitted diseases, and pneumonia. The medication is in a capsule form and takes on a "delayed-release," to ensure it is only broken down once it reaches the intestine and not by stomach acids. The erythromycin breath test has numerous clinical applications, particularly in transplantation and pharmacology. It is frequently used to evaluate the activity of the CYP3A4 enzyme, which is critical in the metabolism of medications such as cyclosporine and tacrolimus in liver transplant patients. Following surgery, the test can help predict the risk of nephrotoxicity from these drugs and assess graft function. Outside of transplantation, the ERMBT is used to investigate drug interactions, alter dosages, and track liver enzyme activity in a variety of medical conditions.

The test allows doctors to determine or predict an individual's drug treatment outcome, such as whether a patient will develop serious or fatal side effects from a certain drug, or which foods and drugs should not be taken together. With this and other tests a physician may determine treatment outcomes in advance or study the effects of new drugs.

Some patients have a congenital inability to synthesize certain enzymes, so drugs may build up to toxic levels in their system or other drugs and foods a patient is taking may consume all of their ability to metabolize certain foods and drugs. An example is: when a person taking a cholesterol-lowering statin drug then drinking grapefruit juice, they may have a poor treatment outcome (adverse drug reaction) and sustain liver damage or kidney failure due to drug induced rhabdomyolysis (the breaking up of muscle tissue).

The test is also used to study liver enzyme regulation under pathological conditions. Studies suggest that it could be useful in determining how chronic liver disorders like fibrosis and cirrhosis affect CYP3A function. Compared to other approaches, the ERMBT gives unique insights into CYP3A-related metabolic pathways and is less susceptible to external influences such as ethanol, making it a dependable option for monitoring liver function.

The erythromycin breath test is frequently compared with other procedures for measuring CYP3A activity, like the urinary 6β-hydroxycortisol to free cortisol ratio (6β-F/FF). While both tests examine enzyme function, there are significant distinctions. The ERMBT evaluates CYP3A activity in the liver, while the 6β-F/FF ratio may indicate activity in other areas of the body, including the kidneys. As a result, the ERMBT is frequently used when a more direct assessment of liver metabolism is required.
