= CYP3A4 =

Enzyme that metabolizes substances by oxidation

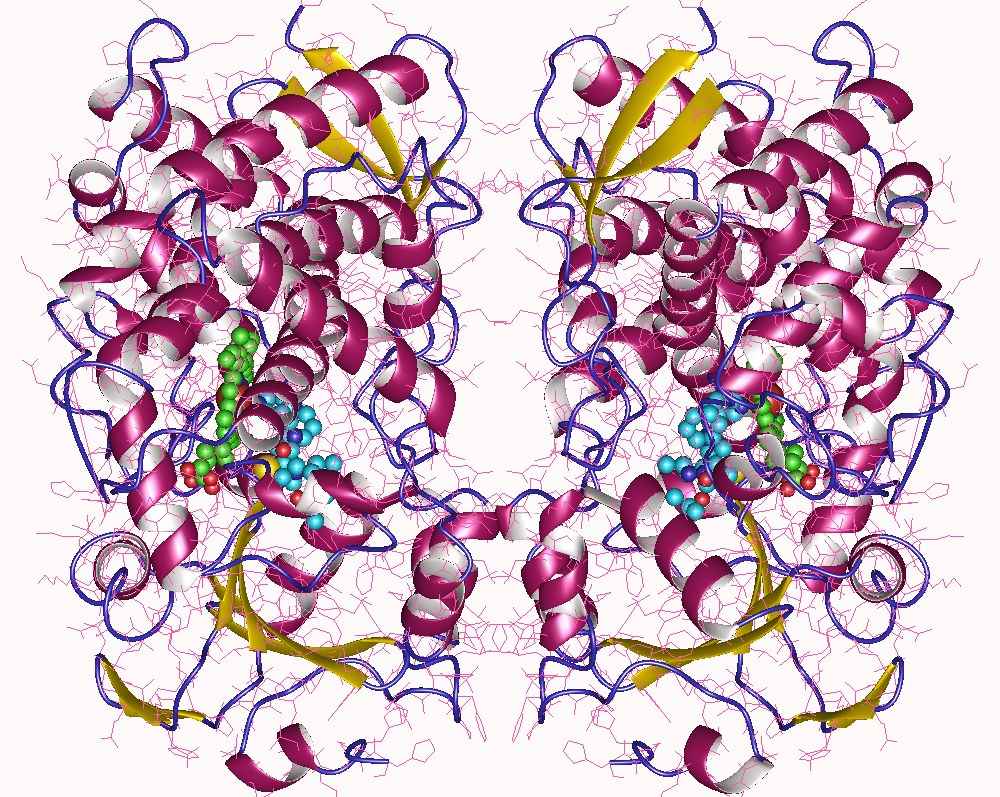

Identifiers
- Aliases: CYP3A4, CP33, CP34, CYP3A, CYP3A3, CYPIIIA3, CYPIIIA4, HLP, NF-25, P450C3, P450PCN1, cytochrome P450 family 3 subfamily A member 4, VDDR3
- External IDs: OMIM: 124010; GeneCards: CYP3A4
Available structures
PDB	Human UniProt search: PDBe RCSB
PDB	List of PDB id codes 1TQN, 1W0E, 1W0F, 1W0G, 2J0D, 2V0M, 3NXU, 3TJS, 3UA1, 4I3Q, 4I4G, 4I4H, 4K9T, 4K9U, 4K9V, 4K9W, 4K9X, 4NY4, 5A1P, 5A1R, 4D6Z, 4D75, 4D78, 4D7D
Enzyme activity
EC #	BRENDA	ExPASy	KEGG	MetaCyc
1.14.13.32	↗	↗	↗	↗
1.14.14.1	↗	↗	↗	↗
1.14.14.55	↗	↗	↗	↗
1.14.14.56	↗	↗	↗	↗
1.14.14.73	↗	↗	↗	↗

Gene location (Human)
Chr.	Chromosome 7 (human)
Band	7q22.1	Start	99,756,960 bp
Band	7q22.1	End	99,784,248 bp
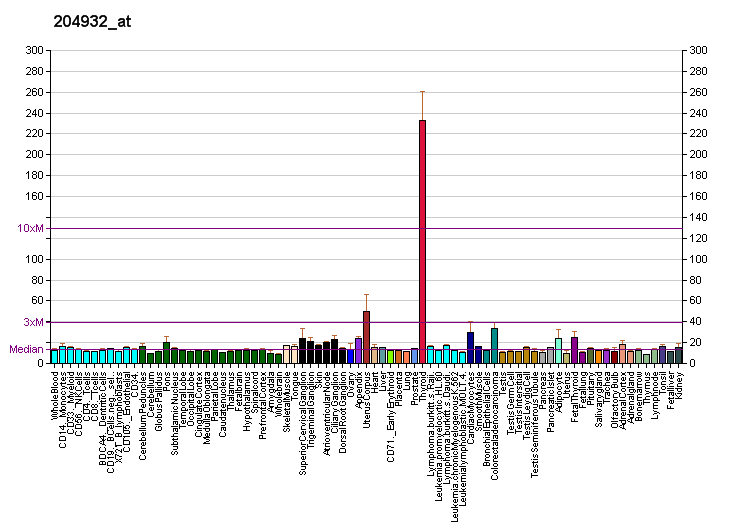

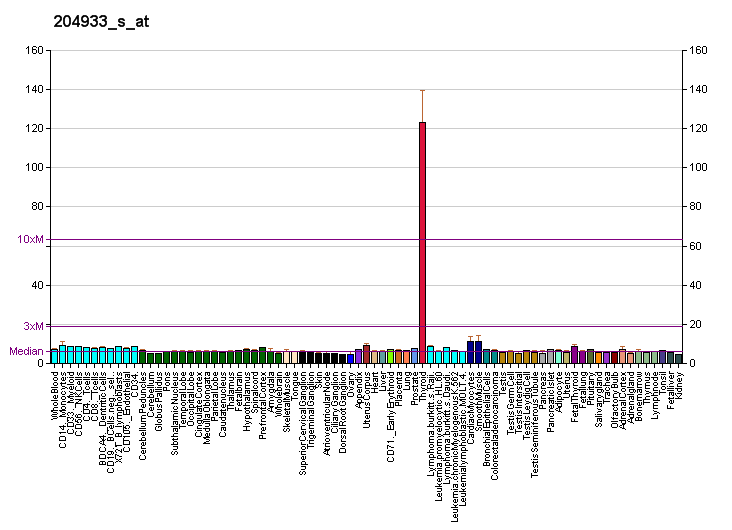
RNA expression pattern
Bgee	Human / Mouse (ortholog); Top expressed in: jejunal mucosa; mucosa of ileum; liver; right lobe of liver; duodenum; olfactory bulb; pancreatic epithelial cell; pancreatic ductal cell; skin of arm; Region I of hippocampus proper / n/a; More reference expression data
BioGPS	More reference expression data
Gene ontology
Molecular function	metal ion binding; heme binding; caffeine oxidase activity; testosterone 6-beta-hydroxylase activity; oxidoreductase activity, acting on paired donors, with incorporation or reduction of molecular oxygen; steroid binding; vitamin D3 25-hydroxylase activity; steroid hydroxylase activity; vitamin D 24-hydroxylase activity; oxygen binding; enzyme binding; iron ion binding; oxidoreductase activity, acting on paired donors, with incorporation or reduction of molecular oxygen, reduced flavin or flavoprotein as one donor, and incorporation of one atom of oxygen; monooxygenase activity; oxidoreductase activity; estrogen 16-alpha-hydroxylase activity
Cellular component	cytoplasm; integral component of membrane; membrane; endoplasmic reticulum; organelle membrane; endoplasmic reticulum membrane; intracellular membrane-bounded organelle
Biological process	xenobiotic metabolic process; heterocycle metabolic process; oxidative demethylation; monoterpenoid metabolic process; steroid catabolic process; androgen metabolic process; alkaloid catabolic process; vitamin D metabolic process; lipid metabolism; calcitriol biosynthetic process from calciol; lipid hydroxylation; steroid metabolic process; long-chain fatty acid biosynthetic process
Sources:Amigo / QuickGO
Orthologs
Databases	NCBI: entry; OMA: entry
Species	Human	Mouse
Entrez	1576	n/a
Ensembl	ENSG00000160868	n/a
UniProt	P08684	n/a
RefSeq (mRNA)	NM_001202855; NM_001202856; NM_001202857; NM_017460	n/a
RefSeq (protein)	NP_001189784; NP_059488	n/a
Location (UCSC)	Chr 7: 99.76 – 99.78 Mb	n/a
PubMed search		n/a
- Wikidata
View/Edit Human

CYP3A4

Identifiers
- EC no.: 1.14.14.56

Databases
- BRENDA: enzyme data
- ExPASy: NiceZyme view
- KEGG: enzyme entry
- MetaCyc: metabolic pathway
- Rhea: reactions
- PDB structures: RCSB PDB PDBe PDBsum
Search
- PMC: articles
- PubMed: articles
- NCBI: proteins

Cytochrome P450 3A4 (abbreviated CYP3A4) (EC 1.14.14.56) is an important enzyme in the body, mainly found in the liver and the intestine. In humans is encoded by CYP3A4 gene. It oxidizes small foreign organic molecules (xenobiotics), such as toxins or drugs, so that they can be removed from the body. The enzyme is highly homologous to CYP3A5, another important CYP3A enzyme.

While many drugs are deactivated by CYP3A4, there are also some drugs that are activated by the enzyme. Some substances, such as some drugs and furanocoumarins present in grapefruit juice, interfere with the action of CYP3A4. These substances will, therefore, either amplify or weaken the action of those drugs that are modified by CYP3A4.

CYP3A4 is a member of the cytochrome P450 family of oxidizing enzymes. Several other members of this family are also involved in drug metabolism, but CYP3A4 is the most common and the most versatile one. Like all members of this family, it is a hemoprotein, i.e. a protein containing a heme group with an iron atom. In humans, the CYP3A4 protein is encoded by the CYP3A4 gene. This gene is part of a cluster of cytochrome P450 genes on chromosome 7q22.1. Previously another CYP3A gene, CYP3A3, was thought to exist; however, it is now thought that this sequence represents a transcript variant of CYP3A4. Alternatively-spliced transcript variants encoding different isoforms have been identified.

== Function ==
CYP3A4 is a member of the cytochrome P450 superfamily of enzymes. The cytochrome P450 proteins are monooxygenases that catalyze many reactions involved in drug metabolism and synthesis of steroids (including cholesterol), and other lipids.

The CYP3A4 protein localizes to the endoplasmic reticulum, and its expression is induced by glucocorticoids and some pharmacological agents. Cytochrome P450 enzymes metabolize approximately 60% of prescribed drugs, with CYP3A4 responsible for about half of this metabolism; substrates include acetaminophen (paracetamol), codeine, ciclosporin (cyclosporin), diazepam, erythromycin, and chloroquine. The enzyme also metabolizes some steroids and carcinogens. Most drugs undergo deactivation by CYP3A4, either directly or by facilitated excretion from the body. Also, many substances are bioactivated by CYP3A4 to form their active compounds, and many protoxins are toxicated into their toxic forms (see table below for examples).

CYP3A4 also possesses epoxygenase activity in that it metabolizes arachidonic acid to epoxyeicosatrienoic acids (EETs), i.e. (±)-8,9-, (±)-11,12-, and (±)-14,15-epoxyeicosatrienoic acids. EETs have a wide range of activities including the promotion of certain types of cancers (see epoxyeicosatetraenoic acid). CYP3A4 promotes the growth of various types of human cancer cell lines in culture by producing (±)-14,15-epoxyeicosatrienoic acids, which stimulate these cells to grow. The CYP3A4 enzyme is also reported to have fatty acid monooxgenase activity for metabolizing arachidonic acid to 20-Hydroxyeicosatetraenoic acid (20-HETE). 20-HETE has a wide range of activities that include growth stimulation in breast and other types of cancers (see 12-hydroxyeicosatetraenoic acid).

== Evolution ==
The CYP3A4 gene exhibits a much more complicated upstream regulatory region in comparison with its paralogs. This increased complexity renders the CYP3A4 gene more sensitive to endogenous and exogenous pregnane X receptor (PXR) and constitutive androstane receptor (CAR) ligands, instead of relying on gene variants for wider specificity. Chimpanzee and human CYP3A4 are highly conserved in metabolism of many ligands, although four amino acids positively selected in humans led to a 5-fold benzylation of 7-BFC in the presence of the hepatotoxic secondary bile acid lithocholic acid. This change in consequence contributes to an increased human defense against cholestasis.

== Tissue distribution ==
Fetuses do not express CYP3A4 in their liver tissue, but rather CYP3A7 (EC 1.14.14.1), which acts on a similar range of substrates. CYP3A4 increases to approximately 40% of adult levels in the fourth month of life and 72% at 12 months.

Although CYP3A4 is predominantly found in the liver, it is also present in other organs and tissues of the body, where it may play an important role in metabolism. CP3A4 is the major CYP enzyme in the intestine. CYP3A4 in the intestine plays an important role in the metabolism of certain drugs. Often this allows prodrugs to be activated and absorbed, as in the case of the histamine H_{1}-receptor antagonist terfenadine.

CYP3A4 has also been identified in the brain, but its role in the central nervous system is unknown.

== Mechanisms ==
Cytochrome P450 enzymes perform an assortment of modifications on a variety of ligands, utilizing its large active site and its ability to bind more than one substrate at a time to perform complicated chemical alterations in the metabolism of endogenous and exogenous compounds. These modifications include hydroxylation, epoxidation of olefins, aromatic oxidation, heteroatom oxidations, N- and O- dealkylation reactions, aldehyde oxidations, dehydrogenation reactions, and aromatase activity.

Hydroxylation of an sp^{3} C-H bond is one of the ways in which CYP3A4 (and cytochrome P450 oxygenases) affects its ligand. In fact, hydroxylation is sometimes followed by dehydrogenation, leading to more complex metabolites. An example of a molecule that undergoes more than one reaction due to CYP3A4 includes tamoxifen, which is hydroxylated to 4-hydroxy-tamoxifen and then dehydrated to 4-hydroxy-tamoxifen quinone methide.

Two mechanisms have been proposed as the primary pathway of hydroxylation in P450 enzymes.

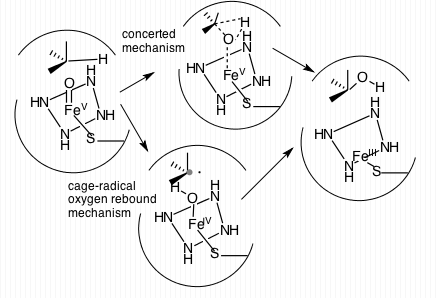
Two of the most commonly proposed mechanisms used for the hydroxylation of an sp^{3} C–H bond

The first pathway suggested is a cage-controlled radical method ("oxygen rebound"), and the second involves a concerted mechanism that does not use a radical intermediate but instead acts quickly via a "radical clock".

== Inhibition through fruit ingestion ==
In 1998, various researchers showed that grapefruit juice, and grapefruit in general, is a potent inhibitor of CYP3A4, which can affect the metabolism of a variety of drugs, increasing their bioavailability. In some cases, this can lead to a fatal interaction with drugs like astemizole or terfenadine. The effect of grapefruit juice on drug absorption was discovered in 1989. The first published report on grapefruit drug interactions was in 1991 in the Lancet entitled "Interactions of Citrus Juices with Felodipine and Nifedipine", and was the first reported food-drug interaction clinically. The effects of grapefruit last from 3 to 7 days, with the greatest effects when juice is taken an hour previous to administration of the drug.

In addition to grapefruit, other fruits have similar effects. Noni (Morinda citrifolia), for example, is a dietary supplement typically consumed as a juice and also inhibits CYP3A4. Pomegranate juice has shown some inhibition in limited studies, but has not yet demonstrated the effect in humans.

== Variability ==
While over 28 single nucleotide polymorphisms (SNPs) have been identified in the CYP3A4 gene, this genetic variation has not been found to translate into significant interindividual variability in vivo. The limited variability may be due to the induction of CYP3A4 on exposure to substrates.

CYP3A4 alleles that have been reported to have minimal function compared to wild-type include CYP3A4*6 (an A17776 insertion) and CYP3A4*17 (F189S). Both of these SNPs led to decreased catalytic activity with certain ligands, including testosterone and nifedipine in comparison to wild-type metabolism. By contrast, CYP3A4*1G allele has more potent enzymatic activity compared to CYP3A4*1A (the wild-type allele).

Variability in CYP3A4 function can be determined noninvasively by the erythromycin breath test (ERMBT). The ERMBT estimates in vivo CYP3A4 activity by measuring the radiolabelled carbon dioxide exhaled after an intravenous dose of (^{14}C-N-methyl)-erythromycin.

== Induction ==
CYP3A4 is induced by a wide variety of ligands. These ligands bind to the pregnane X receptor (PXR). The activated PXR complex forms a heterodimer with the retinoid X receptor (RXR), which binds to the XREM region of the CYP3A4 gene. XREM is a regulatory region of the CYP3A4 gene, and binding causes a cooperative interaction with proximal promoter regions of the gene, resulting in increased transcription and expression of CYP3A4. Activation of the PXR/RXR heterodimer initiates transcription of the CYP3A4 promoter region and gene. Ligand binding increases when in the presence of CYP3A4 ligands, such as in the presence of aflatoxin B1, M1, and G1. Indeed, due to the enzyme's large and malleable active site, it is possible for the enzyme to bind multiple ligands at once, leading to potentially detrimental side effects.

Induction of CYP3A4 has been shown to vary in humans depending on sex. Evidence shows an increased drug clearance by CYP3A4 in women, even when accounting for differences in body weight. A study by Wolbold et al. (2003) found that the median CYP3A4 levels measured from surgically removed liver samples of a random sample of women exceeded CYP3A4 levels in the livers of men by 129%. CYP3A4 mRNA transcripts were found in similar proportions, suggesting a pre-translational mechanism for the up-regulation of CYP3A4 in women. The exact cause of this elevated level of enzyme in women is still under speculation, however studies have explained other mechanisms (such as CYP3A5 or CYP3A7 compensation for lowered levels of CYP3A4) that affect drug clearance in both men and women.

CYP3A4 substrate activation varies amongst different animal species. Certain ligands activate human PXR, which promotes CYP3A4 transcription, while showing no activation in other species. For instance, mouse PXR is not activated by rifampicin and human PXR is not activated by pregnenolone 16α-carbonitrile To aid study of CYP3A4 functional pathways in vivo, mouse strains have been developed using transgenes in order to produce null/human CYP3A4 and PXR crosses. Although humanized hCYP3A4 mice successfully expressed the enzyme in their intestinal tract, low levels of hCYP3A4 were found in the liver. This effect has been attributed to CYP3A4 regulation by the growth hormone signal transduction pathway. In addition to providing an in vivo model, humanized CYP3A4 mice (hCYP3A4) have been used to further emphasize gender differences in CYP3A4 activity.

CYP3A4 activity levels have also been linked to diet and environmental factors, such as duration of exposure to xenobiotic substances. Due to the enzyme's extensive presence in the intestinal mucosa, the enzyme has shown sensitivity to starvation symptoms and is upregulated in defense of adverse effects. Indeed, in fatheaded minnows, unfed female fish were shown to have increased PXR and CYP3A4 expression, and displayed a more pronounced response to xenobiotic factors after exposure after several days of starvation. By studying animal models and keeping in mind the innate differences in CYP3A4 activation, investigators can better predict drug metabolism and side effects in human CYP3A4 pathways.

== Turnover ==
Estimates of the turnover rate of human CYP3A4 vary widely. For hepatic CYP3A4, in vivo methods yield estimates of the enzyme half-life mainly in the range of 70 to 140 hours, whereas in vitro methods give estimates from 26 to 79 hours. Turnover of gut CYP3A4 is likely to be a function of the rate of enterocyte renewal; an indirect approach based on the recovery of activity following exposure to grapefruit juice yields measurements in the 12- to 33-hour range.

== Technology ==
Due to membrane-bound CYP3A4's natural propensity to conglomerate, it has historically been difficult to study drug binding in both solution and on surfaces. Co-crystallization is difficult since the substrates tend to have a low K_{D} (between 5–150 μM) and low solubility in aqueous solutions. A successful strategy in isolating the bound enzyme is the functional stabilization of monomeric CYP3A4 on silver nanoparticles produced from nanosphere lithography and analyzed via localized surface plasmon resonance spectroscopy (LSPR). These analyses can be used as a high-sensitivity assay of drug binding, and may become integral in further high-throughput assays utilized in initial drug discovery testing. In addition to LSPR, CYP3A4-Nanodisc complexes have been found helpful in other applications including solid-state NMR, redox potentiometry, and steady-state enzyme kinetics.

== Ligands ==
Following are lists of selected substrates, inducers and inhibitors of CYP3A4. Where classes of agents are listed, there may be exceptions within the class.

=== Substrates ===
The substrates of CYP3A4 are:

- some immunosuppressants:
  - ciclosporin (cyclosporin),
  - tacrolimus,
  - sirolimus,
  - upadacitinib;
- many chemotherapeutics:
  - docetaxel,
  - tamoxifen,
  - paclitaxel,
  - cyclophosphamide,
  - doxorubicin,
  - erlotinib,
  - etoposide,
  - ifosfamide,
  - teniposide,
  - vinblastine,
  - vincristine,
  - vindesine,
  - imatinib,
  - irinotecan,
  - sorafenib,
  - sunitinib,
  - vemurafenib,
  - temsirolimus,
  - anastrozole,
  - gefitinib;
- azole antifungals:
  - ketoconazole
  - itraconazole
- macrolides (except azithromycin):
  - clarithromycin,
  - erythromycin,
  - telithromycin;
- dapsone (in leprosy),
- tricyclic antidepressants:
  - amitriptyline,
  - clomipramine,
  - imipramine,
  - cyclobenzaprine;
- SSRI antidepressants :
  - citalopram
  - norfluoxetine
  - sertraline
- some other antidepressants:
  - mirtazapine (NaSSA),
  - nefazodone (atypical),
  - reboxetine (NRI),
  - venlafaxine (SNRI),
  - trazodone (SARI),
  - vilazodone (serotonin modulator),
- buspirone (anxiolytic),
- antipsychotics:
  - haloperidol,
  - aripiprazole,
  - risperidone,
  - ziprasidone,
  - pimozide,
  - quetiapine,
  - lurasidone;
- opioids (mainly analgesics):
  - alfentanil,
  - buprenorphine (analgesic, addiction maintenance treatment),
  - codeine (analgesic, antitussive, antidiarrheal),
  - fentanyl,
  - hydrocodone (partial involvement, not the bioactivation factor),
  - methadone (analgesic, addiction maintenance treatment),
  - levacetylmethadol,
  - tramadol (analgesic, refractory RLS treatment);
- benzodiazepines:
  - alprazolam,
  - midazolam,
  - triazolam,
  - diazepam, (bioactivation to desmethyldiazepam)
  - clonazepam;
- some hypnotics:
  - zopiclone,
  - zaleplon,
  - zolpidem,
- donepezil (acetylcholinesterase inhibitor),
- statins (except pravastatin and rosuvastatin):
  - atorvastatin,
  - lovastatin,
  - simvastatin,
  - cerivastatin;
- calcium channel blockers:
  - diltiazem (sensitive substrate),
  - felodipine (sensitive substrate),
  - nifedipine (sensitive substrate),
  - verapamil (sensitive substrate),
  - amlodipine (sensitive substrate),
  - lercanidipine,
  - nitrendipine,
  - nisoldipine,
- amiodarone (class III antiarrhythmic),
- dronedarone (class III antiarrhythmic),
- quinidine (class I antiarrhythmic),
- PDE5 inhibitors:
  - sildenafil,
  - tadalafil,
- kinins (vasodilators, smooth muscle contractors),
- steroids:
  - sex hormones (agonists and antagonists):
    - finasteride (antiandrogen),
    - estradiol (estrogen),
    - progesterone,
    - ethinylestradiol (hormonal contraceptive),
    - testosterone (androgen),
    - toremifene (SERM),
    - bicalutamide;
  - glucocorticoids:
    - budesonide,
    - hydrocortisone (cortisol),
    - dexamethasone,
    - fluticasone;
- some H_{1}-receptor antagonists (H_{1} antihistamines):
  - ketotifen,
  - terfenadine,
  - astemizole,
  - chlorphenamine;
- protease inhibitors:
  - indinavir,
  - ritonavir,
  - saquinavir,
  - nelfinavir;
- non-nucleoside reverse-transcriptase inhibitors (antiretroviral drugs):
  - nevirapine
  - delavirdine,
  - efavirenz,
  - etravirine,
  - rilpivirine;
- albendazole (antihelminthic)
- cisapride, (5-HT4 receptor agonist)
- aprepitant, (antiemetic)
- caffeine, (stimulant)
- cocaine, (stimulant)
- cilostazol, (phosphodiesterase inhibitor)
- dextromethorphan, (antitussive)
- domperidone, (antidopaminergic)
- eplerenone, (aldosterone antagonist)
- lidocaine, (local anesthetic, antiarrhythmic)
- ondansetron, (5-HT3 antagonist)
- propranolol, (beta blocker)
- salmeterol, (beta agonist)
- warfarin, (anticoagulant)
- clopidogrel becoming bioactivated (antiplatelet),
- 2-oxo-clopidogrel,
- omeprazole, (proton pump inhibitor)
- nateglinide, (antidiabetic)
- methoxetamine,
- montelukast (leukotriene receptor antagonist),
- vilaprisan (selective progesterone receptor modulator),
- certain angiotensin II receptor blockers:
  - losartan (sensitive substrates)
  - irbesartan.

=== Inhibitors ===
Inhibitors of CYP3A4 are classified by potency:

- a Strong inhibitor causes at least a 5-fold increase in the plasma AUC values, or more than 80% decrease in clearance.
- a Moderate inhibitor causes at least a 2-fold increase in the plasma AUC values, or 50–80% decrease in clearance.
- a Weak inhibitor causes at least a 1.25-fold but less than 2-fold increase in the plasma AUC values, or 20–50% decrease in clearance.

The inhibitors of CYP3A4 are the following substances.

==== Strong inhibitors ====
- boceprevir,
- protease inhibitors:
  - ritonavir,
  - indinavir,
  - nelfinavir,
  - saquinavir;
- some macrolide antibiotics:
  - clarithromycin,
  - erythromycin (although FDA lists it as a moderate inhibitor, and inhibitor of P-glycoprotein, defined as those increasing the AUC of digoxin to ≥1.25-fold);
  - telithromycin
- ceritinib
- mibefradil (used for the treatment of hypertension and chronic angina pectoris)
- nefazodone (antidepressant)
- ribociclib
- tucatinib
- chloramphenicol (antibiotic)
- some azole antifungals:
  - ketoconazole,
  - itraconazole,
  - posaconazole,
  - voriconazole;
- cobicistat,
- green tea extract,
- grape seed extract,
- dillapiole (compound present in dill plants),
- apigenin (compound present in plants such as celery, parsley, and chamomile)
- Artemisia annua

==== Moderate inhibitors ====
- amiodarone (class III antiarrhythmic),
- aprepitant, (antiemetic)
- ciprofloxacin,
- conivaptan,
- crizotinib,
- rutin (in vitro) (dietary flavonoid),
- tofisopam,
- some calcium channel blockers:
  - verapamil,
  - diltiazem;
- some azole antifungals:
  - fluconazole,
  - miconazole;
- bergamottin (constituent of grapefruit juice),
- cyclosporine,
- donedarone,
- fluvoxamine,
- imatinib,
- valerian.

==== Weak inhibitors ====
- berberine (an alkaloid found in plants such as berberis or goldenseal),
- buprenorphine (analgesic),
- cafestol (in unfiltered coffee)
- cilostazol,
- cimetidine,
- fosaprepitant,
- lomitapide,
- orphenadrine,
- omeprazole (proton pump inhibitor),
- quercetin,
- ranitidine,
- ranolazine,
- tacrolimus,
- ticagrelor,
- valproic acid,
- amlodipine,
- azithromycin (macrolide antibiotic).

==== Inhibitors of unspecified potency ====
- bergaptol (a furocoumarin in citrus),
- cannabidiol,
- dithiocarbamate (functional group),
- flavonoids,
- mifepristone (abortifacient),
- norfloxacin (fluoroquinolone antibiotic),
- some non-nucleoside reverse-transcriptase inhibitors:
  - delavirdine;
- gestodene (hormonal contraceptive),
- star fruit,
- milk thistle,
- niacin (nicotinic acid) and its form – niacinamide (nicotinamide), collectively called as Vitamin B_{3},
- ginkgo biloba,
- sesamin (a lignan constituent in sesame seeds and oil),
- piperine,
- isoniazid,
- serenoa,
- phenelzine (weak, irreversible inhibitor in vitro; clinical potency unestablished).

=== Inducers ===
Strong and moderate CYP3A4 inducers are drugs that decrease the AUC of sensitive substrates of a given pathway where CYP3A4 is involved by ≥80 percent and ≥50 to <80 percent, respectively. Weak inducers decrease the AUC by ≥20 to <50 percent.

The inducers of CYP3A4 are the following substances.

==== Strong inducers ====
- carbamazepine,
- antiandrogens:
  - enzalutamide,
  - apalutamide;
- primidone
- phenytoin (anticonvulsant),
- rifampin.

==== Weak inducers ====
- upadacitinib.

==== Inducers of unspecified potency ====
- anticonvulsants, mood stabilizers:
  - oxcarbazepine,
  - topiramate;
- barbiturates:
  - phenobarbital,
  - butalbital:
- St. John's wort,
- some bactericidals:
  - rifampicin,
  - rifabutin;
- some non-nucleoside reverse-transcriptase inhibitors:
  - efavirenz,
  - nevirapine;
- troglitazone (hypoglycemic),
- glucocorticoids (blood glucose increase, immunosuppressive),
- modafinil (stimulant),
- capsaicin,
- brigatinib,
- clobazam,
- dabrafenib,
- elagolix,
- eslicarbazepine,
- letermovir,
- lorlatinib,
- oritavancin,
- perampanel,
- telotristat.

== Interactive pathway map ==
Click on genes, proteins and metabolites below to link to respective articles. (Note: The interactive pathway map can be edited at WikiPathways: "IrinotecanPathway_WP229".)

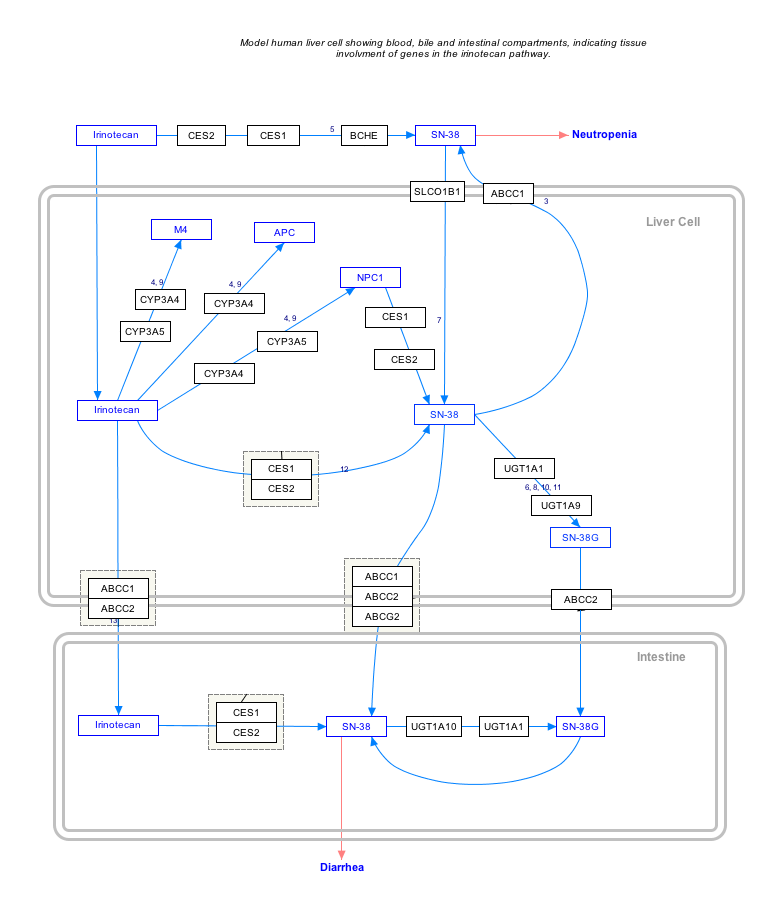

Irinotecan Pathway edit

== See also ==
- List of drugs affected by grapefruit
