= Ketolide =

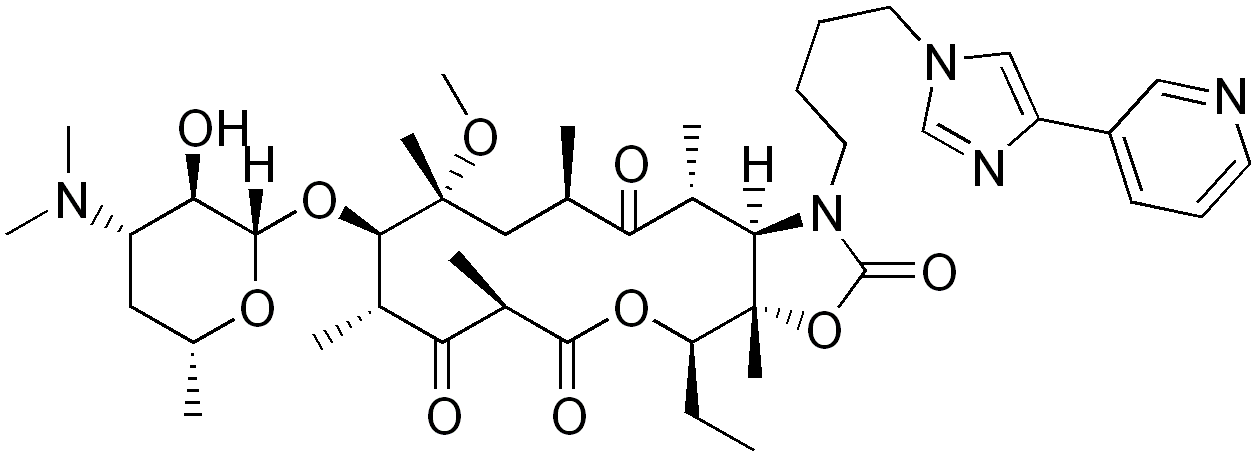
Telithromycin

Ketolides are antibiotics belonging to the macrolide group. Ketolides are derived from erythromycin by substituting the cladinose sugar with a keto-group and attaching a cyclic carbamate group in the lactone ring. These modifications give ketolides much broader spectrum than other macrolides. Moreover, ketolides are effective against macrolide-resistant bacteria, due to their ability to bind at two sites at the bacterial ribosome as well as having a structural modification that makes them poor substrates for efflux-pump mediated resistance.

Ketolides block protein synthesis by binding to ribosomal subunits and may also inhibit the formation of newly forming ribosomes. According to a recent study comparing the action of the classic macrolides erythromycin and azithromycin with ketolides, which are used to treat serious infections, the more powerful drugs (ketolides) were the more "leaky" in blocking the production of proteins. The researchers were surprised to discover that ketolides, which are known to be better antibiotics, allow for many more proteins to be made compared to the older, less efficient macrolides. As a result, it is now believed that allowing cells to make some proteins could be much more damaging for a microbe than not letting it make any proteins at all. The findings may point the way to better and more potent antibiotics.

The only ketolide on the market at this moment is telithromycin, which is sold under the brand name of Ketek. Other ketolides in development include cethromycin and solithromycin.

== Medical uses ==
Ketolides are used to treat community-acquired bacterial pneumonia. Other respiratory tract infections were removed as indications when it was recognized that use of telithromycin can result in hepatitis and liver failure.
