= Telithromycin =

Chemical compound

Clinical data
- Trade names: Ketek, others
- AHFS/Drugs.com: Monograph
- MedlinePlus: a604026
- License data: EU EMA: by INN
- Routes of administration: Oral
- ATC code: J01FA15 (WHO)

Legal status
- Legal status: UK: POM (Prescription only); US: ℞-only

Pharmacokinetic data
- Bioavailability: 57%
- Protein binding: 66% to 79%
- Metabolism: Hepatic (50% CYP3A4-mediated)
- Elimination half-life: 10 hours
- Excretion: Biliary and renal

Identifiers
- IUPAC name: (1S,2R,5R,7R,8R,9S,11R,13R,14R)-8-[(2S,3R,4S,6R)- 4-dimethylamino-3-hydroxy-6-methyl-oxan-2-yl]oxy- 2-ethyl-9-methoxy-1,5,7,9,11,13-hexamethyl-15- [4-(4-pyridin-3-ylimidazol-1-yl)butyl]-3,17-dioxa-15- azabicyclo[12.3.0]heptadecane-4,6,12,16-tetrone
- CAS Number: 191114-48-4
- PubChem CID: 5462516
- DrugBank: DB00976
- ChemSpider: 2273373
- UNII: KI8H7H19WL
- KEGG: D01078
- ChEBI: CHEBI:29688
- ChEMBL: ChEMBL1136
- CompTox Dashboard (EPA): DTXSID3046455
- ECHA InfoCard: 100.208.206

Chemical and physical data
- Formula: C_{43}H_{65}N_{5}O_{10}
- Molar mass: 812.018 g·mol^{−1}
- 3D model (JSmol): Interactive image
- Melting point: 177 °C (351 °F)
- SMILES: O=C2[C@@H]([C@@H](O[C@@H]1O[C@@H](C[C@H](N(C)C)[C@H]1O)C)[C@@](OC)(C)C[C@H](C(=O)[C@H](C)[C@H]3N(C(=O)O[C@]3(C)[C@H](OC(=O)[C@@H]2C)CC)CCCCn4cc(nc4)c5cccnc5)C)C
- InChI: InChI=1S/C43H65N5O10/c1-12-33-43(8)37(48(41(53)58-43)19-14-13-18-47-23-31(45-24-47)30-16-15-17-44-22-30)27(4)34(49)25(2)21-42(7,54-11)38(28(5)35(50)29(6)39(52)56-33)57-40-36(51)32(46(9)10)20-26(3)55-40/h15-17,22-29,32-33,36-38,40,51H,12-14,18-21H2,1-11H3/t25-,26-,27+,28+,29-,32+,33-,36-,37-,38-,40+,42-,43-/m1/s1; Key:LJVAJPDWBABPEJ-PNUFFHFMSA-N

Telithromycin is the first ketolide antibiotic to enter clinical use and is sold under the brand name of Ketek. It is used to treat community acquired pneumonia of mild to moderate severity. After significant safety concerns, the US Food and Drug Administration sharply curtailed the approved uses of the drug in early 2007.

Telithromycin is a semi-synthetic erythromycin derivative. It is created by substituting a ketogroup for the cladinose sugar and adding a carbamate ring in the lactone ring. An alkyl-aryl moiety is attached to this carbamate ring. Furthermore, the oxygen at the 6 position is methylated, as is the case with clarithromycin, to achieve better acid-stability.

It was patented in 1994 and approved for medical use in 2001.

== Adverse effects ==
Most common side-effects are gastrointestinal, including diarrhea, nausea, abdominal pain and vomiting. Headache and disturbances in taste also occur. Less common side-effects include palpitations, blurred vision, and rashes. Prolonged QTc intervals may also be caused by telithromycin.

Rare but severe side-effects were initially reported in March 2006, involving damage to the liver. Three different incidents were reported: one case of temporary drug-induced hepatitis, one ending in a liver transplant, and one ending in death.

In the United States, the FDA's Office of Epidemiology and Surveillance identified 12 cases of acute liver failure, resulting in four deaths, and an additional 23 cases of acute, serious liver injury, among 5.2 million patients taking telithromycin through April 2006.

In 2010, a published report described the likely mechanism of action underlying not only the cases of liver failure but also cases of visual disturbances and exacerbations of myasthenia gravis. The study showed that a pyridine moiety that is part of the telithromycin molecule acts as an antagonist on cholinergic receptors located in the neuromuscular junction, the ciliary ganglion of the eye and the vagus nerve innervating the liver. Other macrolides, such as azithromycin and clarithromycin and the fluoroketolide, solithromycin, do not contain the pyridine moiety and do not antagonize these cholinergic receptors significantly.

== Mechanism of action ==
Telithromycin prevents bacteria from growing, by interfering with their protein synthesis. Telithromycin binds to the subunit 50S of the bacterial ribosome, and blocks the progression of the growing polypeptide chain. Telithromycin has over 10 times higher affinity to the subunit 50S than erythromycin. In addition, telithromycin strongly bind simultaneously to two domains of 23S RNA of the 50 S ribosomal subunit, where older macrolides bind strongly only to one domain and weakly to the second domain. Like many other protein synthesis inhibitors, telithromycin can also inhibit the formation of ribosomal subunits 50S and 30S.

== Pharmacokinetics ==
Unlike erythromycin, telithromycin is acid-stable and can therefore be taken orally while being protected from gastric acids. It is fairly rapidly absorbed, and diffused into most tissues and phagocytes. Due to the high concentration in phagocytes, telithromycin is actively transported to the site of infection. During active phagocytosis, large concentrations of telithromycin is released. The concentration of telithromycin in the tissues is much higher than in plasma. Telithromycin fulfills a role that has arisen due to the rise of microbial resistance to existing macrolides and appears to be effective against macrolide-resistant Streptococcus pneumoniae. The defining differentiating characteristic of the ketolides as opposed to other macrolides is the removal of the neutral sugar, L-cladinose from the 3 position of the macrolide ring and the subsequent oxidation of the 3-hydroxyl to a 3-keto functional group.

== Metabolism ==
Telithromycin is metabolized mainly in the liver, the main elimination route being the bile, a small portion is also excreted into the urine. About one third is excreted unchanged in bile and urine, the biliary route being favoured. Telithromycin's half-life is approximately ten hours.

== History ==
French pharmaceutical company Hoechst Marion Roussel (later Sanofi-Aventis) began phase II/III clinical trials of telithromycin (HMR-3647) in 1998. Telithromycin was approved by the European Commission in July 2001 and subsequently went on sale in October 2001. In the US, telithromycin received U.S. Food and Drug Administration (FDA) approval on April 1, 2004.

=== Safety controversies and fraud ===
FDA staffers publicly complained that safety problems and some data integrity issues were ignored prior to approval, and the House Committee on Energy and Commerce held hearings to examine these complaints. One doctor went to prison because she falsified data in her portion of the clinical trials (about 400 patients out of 24,000). Further, Ketek seemed to cause liver problems, including "liver failure", to a greater extent than would be expected of a common-use antibiotic. The House Committee on Energy and Commerce held hearings.

Study 3014 was a key clinical trial of approximately 24,000 patients which Sanofi-Aventis submitted to the FDA to seek approval for Ketek. The doctor who treated the most patients in Study 3014 (about 400), Maria "Anne" Kirkman Campbell, served a 57-month sentence in federal prison after pleading guilty to mail fraud, by defrauding Aventis and others. The indictment states that Campbell fabricated data she sent to the company. Documents, including internal Sanofi-Aventis emails show that Aventis was worried about Campbell early in study 3014 but didn't tell the FDA until the agency's own inspectors discovered the problem independently.

In January 2006, an article in the March issue of Annals of Internal Medicine was published, citing three recent drug-induced liver injury cases likely due to telithromycin, one resulting in a liver transplant and one in death.

In July 2006, according to the New York Times, unpublished e-mails from FDA safety official David Graham argued telithromycin had not been proven safe, that safer drugs were available for the same indications, and that the approval was a mistake and should be immediately withdrawn.

Between the start of telithromycin's marketing in mid-2004 and September 2006, there were 13 cases of liver failure, including at least four deaths, vision problems, blackouts, syncope, and potentially fatal cases of myasthenia gravis. The Times said that the FDA was embroiled in a "fierce battle" over the approval, fueled by exposure in the press. Senator Charles E. Grassley (R-Iowa, chairman, Senate Finance Committee), Representatives Edward J. Markey (D-Mass) and Henry A. Waxman (D-Calif) held hearings.

=== FDA Warning ===
On February 12, 2007, after an advisory committee discussion and vote in December 2006, the FDA announced a revision to the labeling of Ketek. The changes included the removal of two of the three previously approved indications: acute bacterial sinusitis and acute bacterial exacerbations of chronic bronchitis. The agency determined that the balance of benefits and risks no longer supported approval of the drug for these indications. Ketek remained on the market for the treatment of community acquired bacterial pneumonia of mild to moderate severity (acquired outside of hospitals or long-term care facilities). In addition, the FDA worked with the manufacturer to update the product labeling with a "black box warning," their strongest form of warning. Ketek's warning states that it should not be used in patients with myasthenia gravis, a disease that causes muscle weakness. Following this decision, Sanofi-Aventis withdrew the drug from active sales in the United States.

== Available forms ==
Telithromycin is administered as tablets. The standard dosing is two 400 mg tablets to be taken together daily, with or without food.
