= Cruentaren =

Group of chemical compounds

Chemical structure of cruentaren A

Cruentarens are a group of macrolides secreted by the myxobacteria Byssovorax cruenta. There are two isomers (cruentaren A and B) have been isolated. They each have a molecular formula of C_{33}H_{51}NO_{8} and molecular weight 589 g/mol. Cruentaren A strongly inhibits the growth of yeasts and filamentous fungi, and inhibits the proliferation of different cancer cell lines in vitro, including a multidrug-resistant KB line. Cruentaren B shows only marginal cytotoxicity and no antifungal activity.
