= Mineral dust airway disease =

- Specialty: Pulmonology

Mineral dust airway disease is a general term used to describe complications due to inhaled mineral dust causing fibrosis and narrowing of primarily the respiratory bronchioles. It is a part of a group of disorders known as pneumoconioses which is characterized by inhaled mineral dust and the effects on the lungs.

== Types ==
The three main types of pneumoconioses are Asbestosis (caused by inhaling asbestos), Silicosis (caused by inhaling silica), and Coal Workers pneumoconioses A.K.A Black Lung (caused by inhaling coal dust). There are other forms called Mixed Dust pneumoconioses (caused by inhaling more than one mineral) and Byssinosis (caused by inhaling cotton dust). These two forms are less common and doctors do not often encounter them. Other forms can develop from inhaling a number of different minerals including but not limited to; aluminum, antimony, barium, graphite, iron, kaolin, mica, and talc.

== Symptoms and signs ==
Shortness of breath, Wheezing, Coughing.

== Causes ==
Breathing in or inhaling inorganic dust.

== Diagnosis ==
Chest X-ray, CT scan of the chest, Pulmonary function tests.
