= Desosamine =

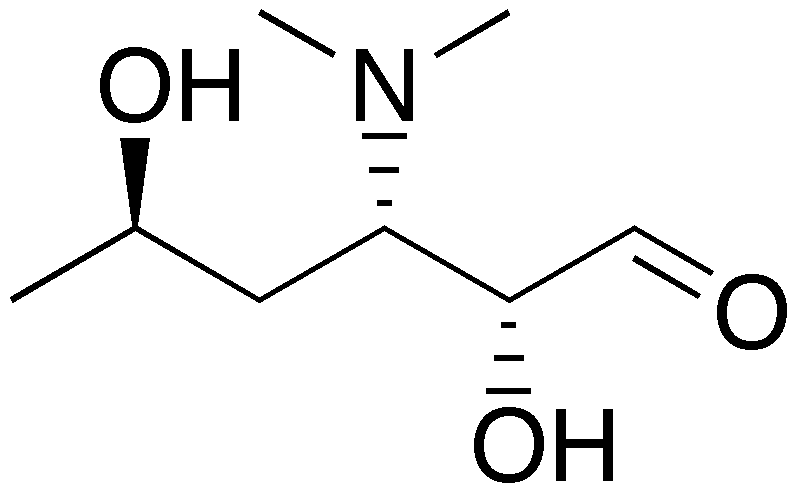

Names
- IUPAC name 3,4,6-Trideoxy-3-(dimethylamino)-D-xylo-hexose
- Systematic IUPAC name (2R,3S,5R)-3-(Dimethylamino)-2,5-dihydroxyhexanal

Identifiers
CAS Number	5779-39-5
3D model (JSmol)	Interactive image
Beilstein Reference	2412240
ChEBI	CHEBI:32540
ChemSpider	147813
PubChem CID	168997
UNII	3NR0662443
CompTox Dashboard (EPA)	DTXSID90206478
- InChI: InChI=1S/C8H17NO3/c1-6(11)4-7(9(2)3)8(12)5-10/h5-8,11-12H,4H2,1-3H3/t6-,7+,8+/m1/s1 Key: VTJCSBJRQLZNHE-CSMHCCOUSA-N; InChI=1/C8H17NO3/c1-6(11)4-7(9(2)3)8(12)5-10/h5-8,11-12H,4H2,1-3H3/t6-,7+,8+/m1/s1 Key: VTJCSBJRQLZNHE-CSMHCCOUBT
- SMILES: O=C[C@H](O)[C@@H](N(C)C)C[C@H](O)C

Properties
Chemical formula	C_{8}H_{17}NO_{3}
Molar mass	175.23 g/mol
- Except where otherwise noted, data are given for materials in their standard state (at 25 °C [77 °F], 100 kPa). verify (what is ?) Infobox references

Desosamine is a 3-(dimethylamino)-3,4,6-trideoxyhexose found in certain macrolide antibiotics (contain a high level of microbial resistance) such as the commonly prescribed erythromycin, azithromycin, clarithromycin, methymycin, narbomycin, oleandomycin, picromycin and roxithromycin. As the name suggests, these macrolide antibiotics contain a macrolide or lactone ring and they are attached to the ring desosamine which is crucial for bactericidal activity. The biological action of the desosamine-based macrolide antibiotics is to inhibit the bacterial ribosomal protein synthesis. These antibiotics which contain desosamine are widely used to cure bacterial infections in human respiratory system, skin, muscle tissues, and urethra.

== Discovery ==
Although desosamine has been found in many macrolide antibiotics, the complete chemical structure of desosamine was not determined until 1962. Nuclear magnetic resonance spectroscopy data was used to establish the complete configuration of desosamine. The hydrogen atoms at the C1, C2, C3, and C5 positions are all found to be axial.

== Biosynthesis ==
Six enzymes are required for desosamine biosynthesis from TDP-glucose in Streptomyces venezuelae. In addition to the required enzymes, there are eight important open reading frames known as the des regions, they are desI~desVIII, these eight frames are the necessary genes used in desosamine biosynthesis, among the 8 des regions, the desI gene implements C-4 deoxygenation by the enzymatic activity of dehydrase.

== Degradation ==
Degradation of several of the aforementioned antibiotics yields the desosamine sugar. It is found in combination with the smaller macrolide rings, always attached at C-3 or C-5 of the aglycone. Alkaline degradation found the sugar to be a D-hexose derivative. Glycosidic cleavage of methomycin produces aglycone methynolide and the basic sugar desosamine, whose structure had been determined by oxidative degradation to crotonaldehyde and by other experiments.

== Drug resistance ==
Macrolide antibiotics that contain desosamine as an amino sugar in their chemical structures sometimes encounter drug-resistant bacteria. The target-site modification can result in changing chemical structure of the antibiotics, for example, a methylation mutation, which will block the drug from normally functioning.

== See also ==
- Deoxy sugar
