= Macrolide =

Class of natural products

Erythromycin. The macrolide ring is the lactone (cyclic ester) at upper left.

Clarithromycin

Roxithromycin

Macrolides are a class of mostly natural products with a large macrocyclic lactone ring to which one or more deoxy sugars, usually cladinose and desosamine, may be attached. Macrolides belong to the polyketide class of natural products. Some macrolides have antibiotic or antifungal activity and are used as pharmaceutical drugs. Rapamycin is also a macrolide and was originally developed as an antifungal, but has since been used as an immunosuppressant drug and is being investigated as a potential longevity therapeutic.

Macrolides are a diverse group with many members of very different properties:

- Macrolides with 14-, 15-, or 16-membered rings and two attached sugar molecules are antibiotics that bind to bacterial ribosomes, the key representative being erythromycin. The term "macrolide antibiotics" tend to refer to just this class.
- Some macrolides with very large (20+ membered) rings are immunosuppressants, the prototypical one being rapamycin.
- Some 23-membered macrolides are also antibiotics that bind to the 50S part of the bacterial ribosome, see streptogramin A.
- Polyene antimycotics are also technically macrolides.

== Definition ==
In general, any macrocyclic lactone having greater than 8-membered rings are candidates for this class. The macrocycle may contain amino nitrogen, amide nitrogen (but should be differentiated from cyclopeptides), an oxazole ring, or a thiazole ring. Benzene rings are excluded, in order to differentiate from tannins. Also lactams instead of lactones (as in the ansamycin family) are excluded. Included are not only 12-16 membered macrocycles but also larger rings as in tacrolimus.

== History ==
The first macrolide discovered was erythromycin, which was first used in 1952. Erythromycin was widely used as a substitute to penicillin in cases where patients were allergic to penicillin or had penicillin-resistant illnesses. Later macrolides developed, including azithromycin and clarithromycin, stemmed from chemically modifying erythromycin; these compounds were designed to be more easily absorbed and have fewer side-effects (erythromycin caused gastrointestinal side-effects in a significant proportion of users).

== Uses ==
Antibiotic macrolides are used to treat infections caused by Gram-positive bacteria (e.g., Streptococcus pneumoniae) and limited Gram-negative bacteria (e.g., Bordetella pertussis, Haemophilus influenzae), and some respiratory tract and soft-tissue infections. The antimicrobial spectrum of macrolides is slightly wider than that of penicillin, and, therefore, macrolides are a common substitute for patients with a penicillin allergy. Beta-hemolytic streptococci, pneumococci, staphylococci, and enterococci are usually susceptible to macrolides. Unlike penicillin, macrolides have been shown to be effective against Legionella pneumophila, Mycoplasma, Mycobacterium, some Rickettsia, and Chlamydia.

Macrolides are not to be used on nonruminant herbivores, such as horses and rabbits. They rapidly produce a reaction causing fatal digestive disturbance. It can be used in horses less than one year old, but care must be taken that other horses (such as a foal's mare) do not come in contact with the macrolide treatment.

Macrolides can be administered in a variety of ways, including tablets, capsules, suspensions, injections and topically.

== Mechanism of action ==
=== Antibacterial ===
Macrolides are protein synthesis inhibitors. The mechanism of action of macrolides is inhibition of bacterial protein biosynthesis, and they are thought to do this by preventing peptidyltransferase from adding the growing peptide attached to tRNA to the next amino acid (similarly to chloramphenicol) as well as inhibiting bacterial ribosomal translation. Another potential mechanism is premature dissociation of the peptidyl-tRNA from the ribosome.

Macrolide antibiotics bind reversibly to the P site on the 50S subunit of the bacterial ribosome. This action is considered to be bacteriostatic. Macrolides are actively concentrated within leukocytes, and thus are transported into the site of infection.

=== Immunomodulation ===
==== Diffuse panbronchiolitis ====
The macrolide antibiotics erythromycin, clarithromycin, and roxithromycin have proven to be an effective long-term treatment for the idiopathic, Asian-prevalent lung disease diffuse panbronchiolitis (DPB). The successful results of macrolides in DPB stems from controlling symptoms through immunomodulation (adjusting the immune response), with the added benefit of low-dose requirements.

With macrolide therapy in DPB, great reduction in bronchiolar inflammation and damage is achieved through suppression of not only neutrophil granulocyte proliferation but also lymphocyte activity and obstructive secretions in airways. The antimicrobial and antibiotic effects of macrolides, however, are not believed to be involved in their beneficial effects toward treating DPB. This is evident, as the treatment dosage is much too low to fight infection, and in DPB cases with the occurrence of the macrolide-resistant bacterium Pseudomonas aeruginosa, macrolide therapy still produces substantial anti-inflammatory results.

== Examples ==
=== Antibiotic macrolides ===
US FDA-approved:

- Azithromycin – unique; does not extensively inhibit CYP3A4
- Clarithromycin
- Dirithromycin – discontinued but was US FDA approved
- Erythromycin

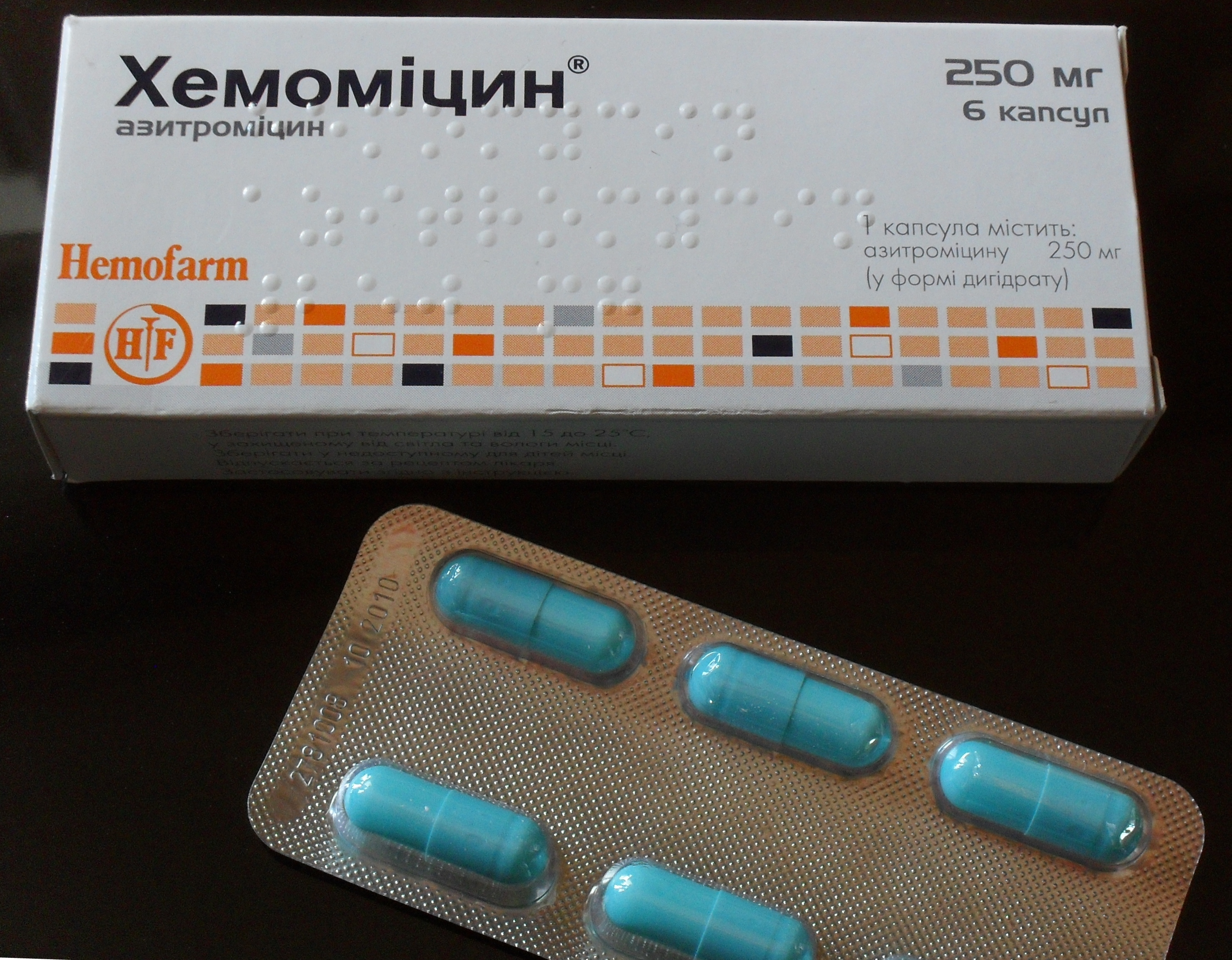
Azithromycin capsules

Not approved in the US by FDA but approved in the other countries by respective national authorities:

- Carbomycin A
- Josamycin
- Kitasamycin
- Midecamycin/midecamycin acetate
- Oleandomycin
- Spiramycin – approved in the EU, and in other countries
- Troleandomycin – used in Italy and Turkey
- Tylosin/tylocine – used in animals
- Roxithromycin

Not approved as a drug for medical use:

- Boromycin (not a member of the classical 14–16-membered class)

=== Ketolides ===
Ketolides are a class of antibiotics that are structurally related to the macrolides. They are used to treat respiratory tract infections caused by macrolide-resistant bacteria. Ketolides are especially effective, as they have two ribosomal binding sites.

Ketolides include:

- Telithromycin – the first and only approved ketolide
- Cethromycin
- Solithromycin

=== Fluoroketolides ===
Fluoroketolides are a class of antibiotics that are structurally related to the ketolides. The fluoroketolides have three ribosomal interaction sites.

Fluoroketolides include:

- Solithromycin – the first and so far only fluoroketolide (not yet approved)

=== Non-antibiotic macrolides ===
The drugs tacrolimus, pimecrolimus, and sirolimus, which are used as immunosuppressants or immunomodulators, are also macrolides. They have similar activity to ciclosporin.

=== Antifungal drugs ===
Polyene antimycotics, such as amphotericin B, nystatin etc., are a subgroup of macrolides. Cruentaren is another example of an antifungal macrolide.

=== Toxic macrolides ===
A variety of toxic macrolides produced by bacteria have been isolated and characterized, such as the mycolactones.

== Resistance ==
The primary means of bacterial resistance to macrolides occurs by post-transcriptional methylation of the 23S bacterial ribosomal RNA. This acquired resistance can be either plasmid-mediated or chromosomal, i.e., through mutation, and results in cross-resistance to macrolides, lincosamides, and streptogramins (an MLS-resistant phenotype).

Two other forms of acquired resistance include the production of drug-inactivating enzymes (esterases or kinases), as well as the production of active ATP-dependent efflux proteins that transport the drug outside of the cell.

Azithromycin has been used to treat strep throat (Group A streptococcal (GAS) infection caused by Streptococcus pyogenes) in penicillin-sensitive patients; however, macrolide-resistant strains of GAS occur with moderate frequency. Cephalosporin is another option for these patients.

== Side-effects ==
A 2008 British Medical Journal article highlights that the combination of some macrolides and statins (used for lowering cholesterol) is not advisable and can lead to debilitating myopathy. This is because some macrolides (clarithromycin and erythromycin, not azithromycin) are potent inhibitors of the cytochrome P450 system, particularly of CYP3A4. Macrolides, mainly erythromycin and clarithromycin, also have a class effect of QT prolongation, which can lead to torsades de pointes. Macrolides exhibit enterohepatic recycling; that is, the drug is absorbed in the gut and sent to the liver, only to be excreted into the duodenum in bile from the liver. This can lead to a buildup of the product in the system, thereby causing nausea. In infants the use of erythromycin has been associated with pyloric stenosis.

Some macrolides are also known to cause cholestasis, a condition where bile cannot flow from the liver to the duodenum. A study reported in 2019 found an association between erythromycin use during infancy and developing IHPS (Infantile hypertrophic pyloric stenosis) in infants. However, no significant association was found between macrolides use during pregnancy or breastfeeding.

A Cochrane review showed gastrointestinal symptoms to be the most frequent adverse event reported in literature.

== Interactions ==
CYP3A4 is an enzyme that metabolizes many drugs in the liver. Macrolides inhibit CYP3A4, which means they reduce its activity and increase the blood levels of the drugs that depend on it for elimination. This can lead to adverse effects or drug-drug interactions.

Macrolides have cyclic structure with a lactone ring and sugar moieties. They can inhibit CYP3A4 by a mechanism called mechanism-based inhibition (MBI), which involves the formation of reactive metabolites that bind covalently and irreversibly to the enzyme, rendering it inactive. MBI is more serious and long-lasting than reversible inhibition, as it requires the synthesis of new enzyme molecules to restore the activity.

The degree of MBI by macrolides depends on the size and structure of their lactone ring. Clarithromycin and erythromycin have a 14-membered lactone ring, which is more prone to demethylation by CYP3A4 and subsequent formation of nitrosoalkenes, the reactive metabolites that cause MBI. Azithromycin, on the other hand, has a 15-membered lactone ring, which is less susceptible to demethylation and nitrosoalkene formation. Therefore, azithromycin is a weak inhibitor of CYP3A4, while clarithromycin and erythromycin are strong inhibitors which increase the area under the curve (AUC) value of co-administered drugs more than five-fold. AUC it is a measure of the drug exposure in the body over time. By inhibiting CYP3A4, macrolide antibitiotics, such as erythromycin and clarithromycin, but not azithromycin, can significantly increase the AUC of the drugs that depend on it for clearance, which can lead to higher risk of adverse effects or drug-drug interactions. Azithromycin stands apart from other macrolide antibiotics because it is a weak inhibitor of CYP3A4, and does not significantly increase AUC value of co-administered drugs.

The difference in CYP3A4 inhibition by macrolides has clinical implications, for example, for patients who take statins, which are cholesterol-lowering drugs that are mainly metabolized by CYP3A4. Co-administration of clarithromycin or erythromycin with statins can increase the risk of statin-induced myopathy, a condition that causes muscle pain and damage. Azithromycin, however, does not significantly affect the pharmacokinetics of statins and is considered a safer alternative. Another option is to use fluvastatin, a statin that is metabolized by CYP2C9, an enzyme that is not inhibited by clarithromycin.

Macrolides, including azithromycin, should not be taken with colchicine as it may lead to colchicine toxicity. Symptoms of colchicine toxicity include gastrointestinal upset, fever, myalgia, pancytopenia, and organ failure.
