= Cethromycin =

Chemical compound

Clinical data
- Routes of administration: Oral
- ATC code: none

Legal status
- Legal status: US: Phase III Clinical Trials

Pharmacokinetic data
- Bioavailability: Between 35.8 and 60% in animal studies.
- Metabolism: Liver
- Elimination half-life: 1.6, 3.0, 4.5, 5.9 and 6 hours. Mouse, Monkey, Rat, Dog and Human respectively.
- Excretion: 7.0% urine 87.2% faeces

Identifiers
- IUPAC name: (1S,2R,5R,7R,8R,9S,11R,13R,14R)-8-[(2S,3R,4S,6R)- 4-Dimethylamino-3-hydroxy-6-methyloxan-2-yl]oxy-2-ethyl-1,5,7,9,11,13- hexamethyl-9-[(E)-3-quinolin-3-ylprop-2-enoxy] -3,17-dioxa-15-azabicyclo[12.3.0]heptadecane-4,6,12,16-tetrone
- CAS Number: 205110-48-1
- PubChem CID: 5282045
- ChemSpider: 23258189
- UNII: J0086219X6
- KEGG: D02391
- ChEBI: CHEBI:29506
- ChEMBL: ChEMBL365528

Chemical and physical data
- Formula: C_{42}H_{59}N_{3}O_{10}
- Molar mass: 765.945 g·mol^{−1}
- 3D model (JSmol): Interactive image
- Melting point: 211 to 213 °C (412 to 415 °F)
- SMILES: CC[C@@H]1[C@@]2([C@@H]([C@H](C(=O)[C@@H](C[C@]([C@@H]([C@H](C(=O)[C@H](C(=O)O1)C)C)O[C@H]3[C@@H]([C@H](C[C@H](O3)C)N(C)C)O)(C)OC/C=C/c4cc5ccccc5nc4)C)C)NC(=O)O2)C
- InChI: InChI=1S/C42H59N3O10/c1-11-32-42(8)36(44-40(50)55-42)25(4)33(46)23(2)21-41(7,51-18-14-15-28-20-29-16-12-13-17-30(29)43-22-28)37(26(5)34(47)27(6)38(49)53-32)54-39-35(48)31(45(9)10)19-24(3)52-39/h12-17,20,22-27,31-32,35-37,39,48H,11,18-19,21H2,1-10H3,(H,44,50)/b15-14+/t23-,24-,25+,26+,27-,31+,32-,35-,36-,37-,39+,41+,42-/m1/s1; Key:PENDGIOBPJLVBT-HMMOOPTJSA-N

Cethromycin, trade name Restanza (initially known as ABT-773) is a ketolide antibiotic undergoing research for the treatment of community acquired pneumonia (CAP) and for the prevention of post-exposure inhalational anthrax, and was given an "orphan drug" status for this indication. Originally discovered and developed by Abbott, it was acquired by Advanced Life Sciences Inc. for further development.

On October 1, 2008, Advanced Life Sciences submitted a New Drug Application (NDA) to Food and Drug Administration (FDA) for cethromycin to treat mild-to-moderate community acquired pneumonia.

On December 3, 2008, Advanced Life Sciences announced that this New Drug Application has been accepted for filing by the FDA.

In June 2009, an FDA Anti-Infective Drugs Advisory Committee review found insufficient evidence for cethromycin efficacy in treatment of community acquired pneumonia, as the Phase 3 clinical trial followed standards that were updated after the clinical trial but three months prior to review. The committee did, however, find the drug safe to use.
