= Cladinose =

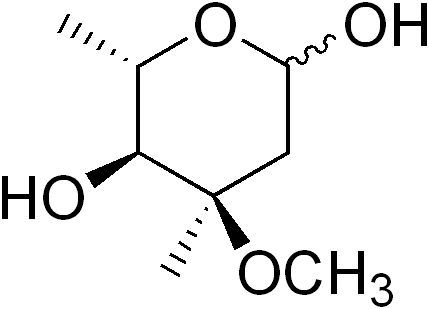

Names
- IUPAC name 2,6-Dideoxy-3-C-methyl-3-O-methyl-l-ribo-hexose
- Systematic IUPAC name (4R,5S,6S)-4-Methoxy-4,6-dimethyl-tetrahydropyran-2,5-diol

Identifiers
CAS Number	470-12-2
3D model (JSmol)	Interactive image
ChemSpider	391713
PubChem CID	443504
CompTox Dashboard (EPA)	DTXSID60197001
- InChI: InChI=1S/C8H16O4/c1-5-7(10)8(2,11-3)4-6(9)12-5/h5-7,9-10H,4H2,1-3H3/t5-,6?,7-,8+/m0/s1 Key: YHVUVJYEERGYNU-SBEGJHHSSA-N; InChI=1/C8H16O4/c1-5-7(10)8(2,11-3)4-6(9)12-5/h5-7,9-10H,4H2,1-3H3/t5-,6?,7-,8+/m0/s1 Key: YHVUVJYEERGYNU-SBEGJHHSBA
- SMILES: C[C@H]1[C@@H]([C@](CC(O1)O)(C)OC)O

Properties
Chemical formula	C_{8}H_{16}O_{4}
Molar mass	176.21 g/mol
Density	1.156 g/mL
- Except where otherwise noted, data are given for materials in their standard state (at 25 °C [77 °F], 100 kPa). verify (what is ?) Infobox references

Cladinose is a hexose deoxy sugar that in several antibiotics (such as erythromycin) is attached to the macrolide ring.

In ketolides, a relatively new class of antibiotics, the cladinose is replaced with a keto group.

Erythromycin A with cladinose visible at bottom
