= Urethral cancer =

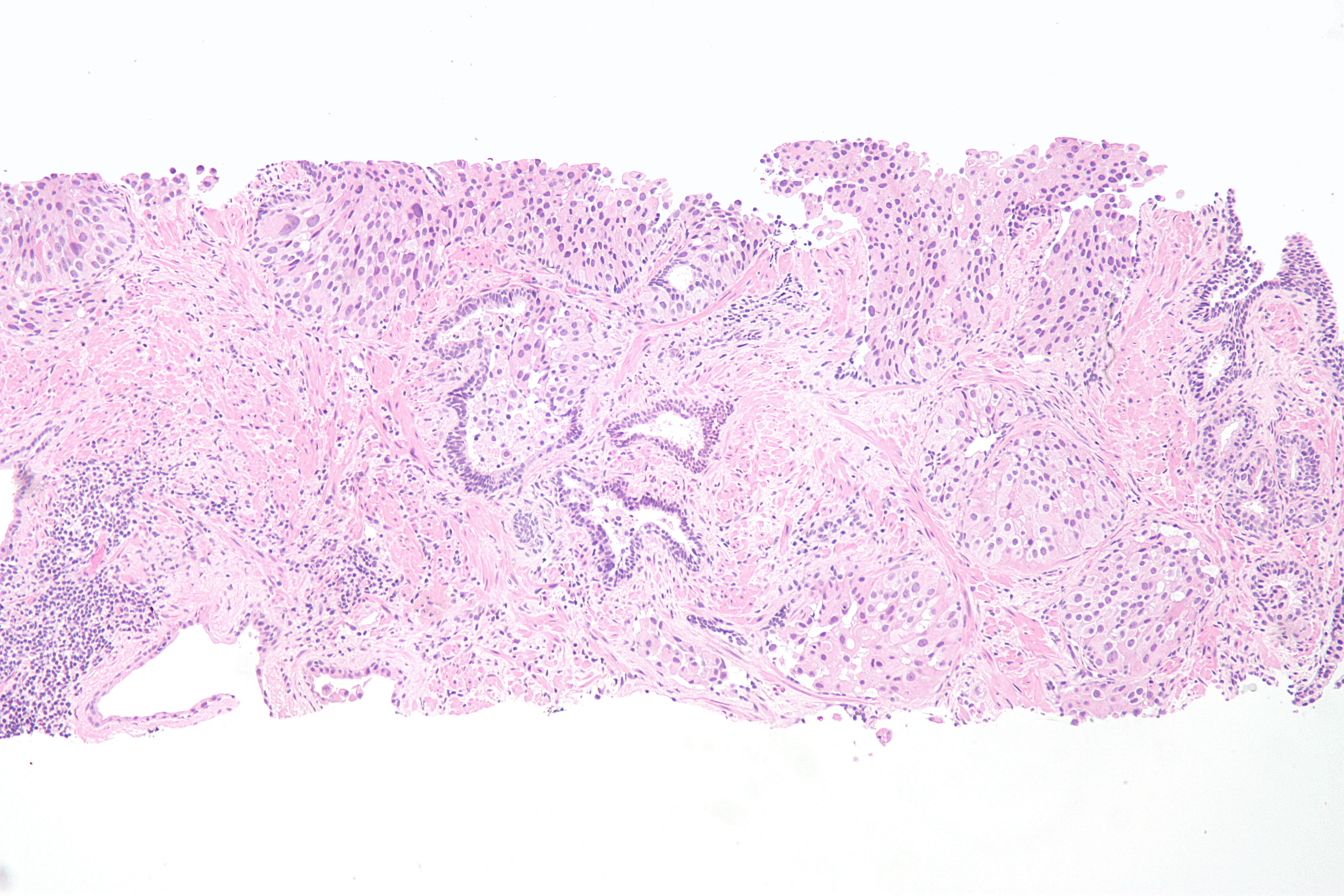
- Micrograph of a urethral cancer, urothelial cell carcinoma, found on a prostate core biopsy. H&E stain.
- Specialty: Oncology Urology
- Symptoms: Blood in the urine, lump at end of penis, Bloody urethral discharge.

Urethral cancer is a rare cancer originating from the urethra. The disease has been classified by the TNM staging system and the World Health Organization.

Symptoms include blood in the urine, lump at end of penis, or bloody penile discharge.

Diagnosis is established by transurethral biopsy.

The most common type is papillary urothelial carcinoma. Risk factors suggested include prolonged irritations of the urethra due to urinary catheterization, chronic inflammation due to infection, radiation, diverticula of the urethra, and urethral strictures.

== Signs and symptoms ==
Symptoms that may be caused by urethral cancer include:

- Blood visible in urine.
- Bloody urethral discharge.
- Weak or interrupted flow of urine.
- Urination occurs often, painful urination, inability to pass urine.
- A lump or thickness in the perineum or penis.
- Enlarged lymph nodes or pain in the groin or vaginal area.

== Diagnosis ==
Diagnosis is established by transurethral biopsy and histological findings. Bladder cystoscopy is performed to detect if there is simultaneous bladder cancer.

== Histology ==
The most common histology seen in primary urethral cancer (a cancer which originates in the urethra, as opposed to cancer cells from elsewhere in the body which metastasize to the area) is urothelium, a type of transitional epithelium. Urothelial cell cancers comprise just over half of primary urethral cancers. Roughly another quarter of cases are squamous cell carcinomas, and the majority of the remainder are adenocarcinomas, which originate from the cells of various secretory glands in and around the urethra. Up to 10% of primary urethral cancers have variant histology types, or have unclear cells of origin.

== Staging ==
The World Health Organization classification of tumours of the urinary system and male genital organs (4th edn) was published in January 2016. Urethral cancer has also been classified by the TNM staging system.

TNM classification and 2016 WHO grading for primary urethral carcinoma
T-category	Description
TX	Primary tumor cannot be assessed
T0	No evidence of primary tumor
Urethra (male and female)
Ta	Noninvasive papillary, polypoid, or verrucous carcinoma
Tis	Carcinoma in situ
T1	Tumor invades subepithelial connective tissue
T2	Tumor invades any of the following: corpus spongiosum, prostate, periurethral muscle
T3	Tumor invades any of the following: corpus cavernosum, beyond prostatic capsule, anterior vagina, bladder neck (extraprostatic extension)
T4	Tumor invades other adjacent organs (invasion of the bladder)
Urothelial (transitional cell) carcinoma of the prostate
Tis pu	Carcinoma in situ, involvement of prostatic urethra
Tis pd	Carcinoma in situ, involvement of prostatic ducts
T1	Tumor invades subepithelial connective tissue (for tumors involving prostatic urethra only)
T2	Tumor invades any of the following: prostatic stroma, corpus spongiosum, periurethral muscle
Ta	Noninvasive papillary, polypoid, or verrucous carcinoma
T3	Tumor invades any of the following: corpus cavernosum, beyond prostatic capsule, bladder neck (extraprostatic extension)
T4	Tumor invades other adjacent organs (invasion of the bladder or rectum)
N—regional lymph nodes
NX	Regional lymph nodes cannot be assessed
N0	No regional lymph node metastasis
N1	Metastasis in a single lymph node
N2	Metastasis in multiple lymph nodes
M—Distant Metastasis
M0	No distant metastasis
M1	Distant metastasis

== Treatment ==
Surgery is the most common treatment for cancer of the urethra. One of the following types of surgery may be done: Open excision, Electro-resection with flash, Laser surgery, Cystourethrectomy, Cystoprostatectomy, Anterior body cavity, or Incomplete or basic penectomy surgery.

Radiation therapy is also an option. However, due to increased rates of complications such as urethral stricture, urinary incontinence, stenosis of the urethra, non-infectious cystitis, and other disorders of the pelvic region, surgery is preferred over radiation therapy. Chemotherapy and radiation therapy are often used together against cancers which prove resistant to one or the other.

Chemotherapy is sometimes used to destroy urethral cancer cells. It is a systemic urethral cancer treatment (i.e., destroys urethral cancer cells throughout the body) that is administered orally or intravenously. Medications are often used in combination to destroy urethral cancer that has metastasized. Commonly used drugs include cisplatin, vincristine, and methotrexate.

Side effects include anemia (causing fatigue, weakness), nausea and vomiting, loss of appetite, hair loss, mouth sores, increased risk for infection, shortness of breath, or excessive bleeding and bruising.

== Epidemiology ==
Primary urethral cancer is rare and contributes to less than 1% of all cancers. It is three times more common in men than women and its incidence rises after the age of 75.

Around half of affected people have locally advanced disease when they first present. 54–65% of cases are of the urothelial carcinoma type.

Prolonged irritations of the urethra due to urinary catheterization, chronic inflammation due to infection, radiation, diverticula of the urethra, and urethral strictures, may increase the risk of primary urethral cancer. Other risk factors include squamous cell carcinoma (SCC) and genital lichen sclerosus.

== Prognosis ==
A study of the National Cancer Database in the United States assessed cases of primary urethral cancer from 2004 to 2013, finding that median survival was 49 months with 5- and 10-year survival rates estimated at 46% and 31% respectively. A study of the RARECARE project, aimed at investigating rare cancers in Europe, estimated a 5-year relative survival rate of 54% in patients with cancer of the urethra.

== See also ==
- Anterior urethral cancer
- Penile cancer
