= Urethral diverticulum =

Human disease

A urethral diverticulum is a condition where the urethra or the periurethral glands push into the connective tissue layers (fascia) that surround it.

== Signs and symptoms ==
Urethral diverticula are often asymptomatic and symptoms that are present tend to be nonspecific. They can co-occur with cancer, in approximately 6-9% of cases, most commonly adenocarcinoma, but also including squamous cell carcinoma and transitional cell carcinoma. Approximately 10% of cases co-occur with kidney stones.

There are 2 types of urethral diverticulums. Congenital and acquired. In infancy usually the urethral diverticulum is congenital but in rare instances acquired urethral diverticulum can be seen in infancy specially following traumatic catheterization.

Common symptoms of urethral diverticulum include incontinence, urinary frequency and urgency, pain during sex, and pain during urination. Other symptoms include pain localized to the urethra or pelvis and frequent urinary tract infection.

When urethral diverticulum becomes severe, a painful mass can sometimes be felt inside the introitus of the vagina, which can discharge pus. If the mass is hard or bleeds, complications like cancer or kidney stones may be present.

== Causes ==
Few urethral diverticula are present at birth; the vast majority are acquired. Acquired urethral diverticula can be caused by trauma and/or infection. When the peri-urethral ducts become infected repeatedly, they can become blocked and eventually cause a diverticulum. They are usually found in the middle of the urethra or the end farthest from the bladder.

Congenital urethral diverticula can arise from several embryological sources. These include defects in the primordial folds and remnants of Gartner's duct.

== Pathology ==
Histopathologically, several characteristics are frequently visible in urethral diverticula. These include nephrogenic adenoma, chronic inflammation associated with fibrosis around the glands, small or absent epithelium, chronic cystitis, cystitis cystica, cystitis glandularis, squamous metaplasia, and adenomatous metaplasia.

Approximately 1/3 of diverticula are compound or multiple, and some can extend to surround the urethra.

== Diagnosis ==
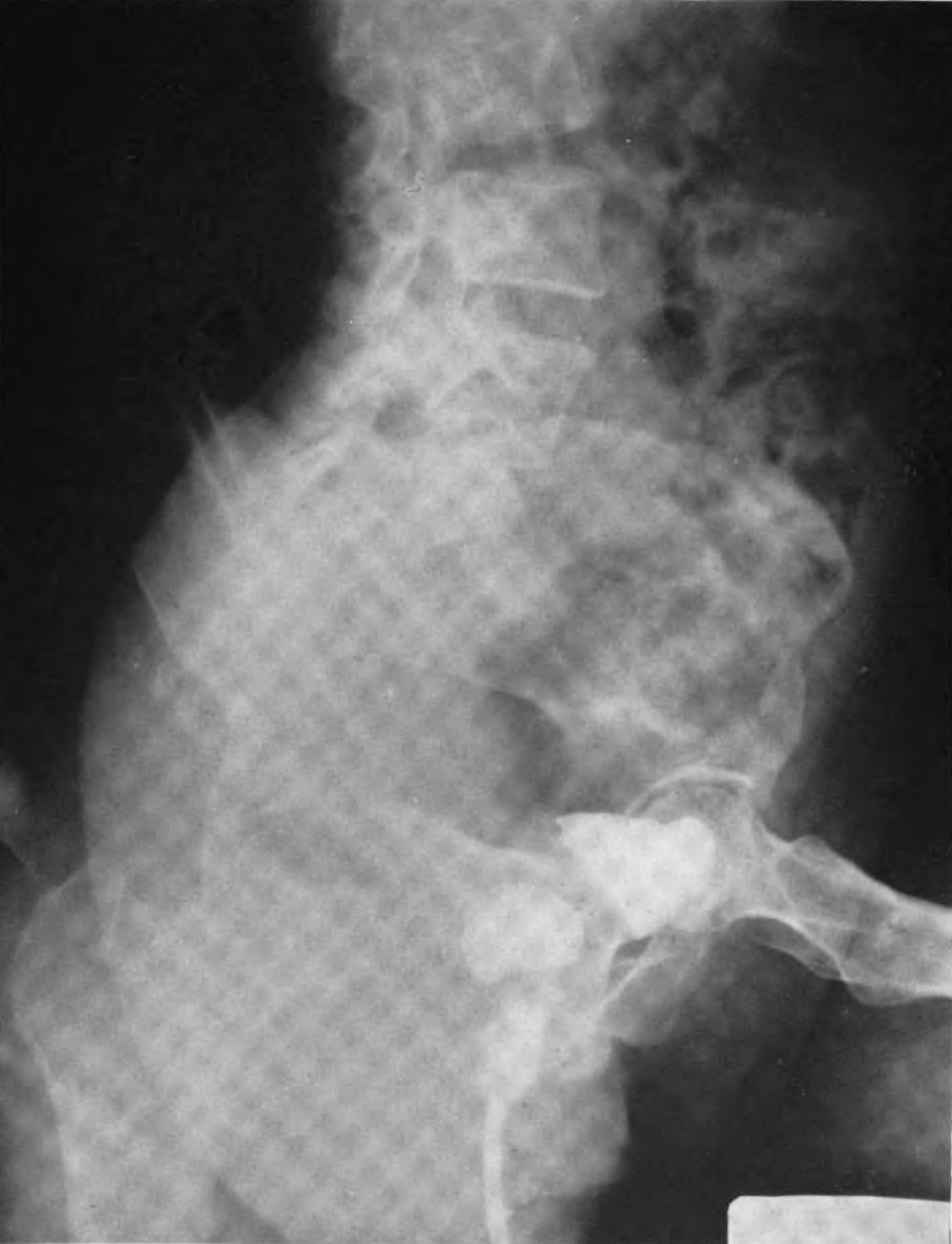
A urethral diverticulum seen on urethrogram

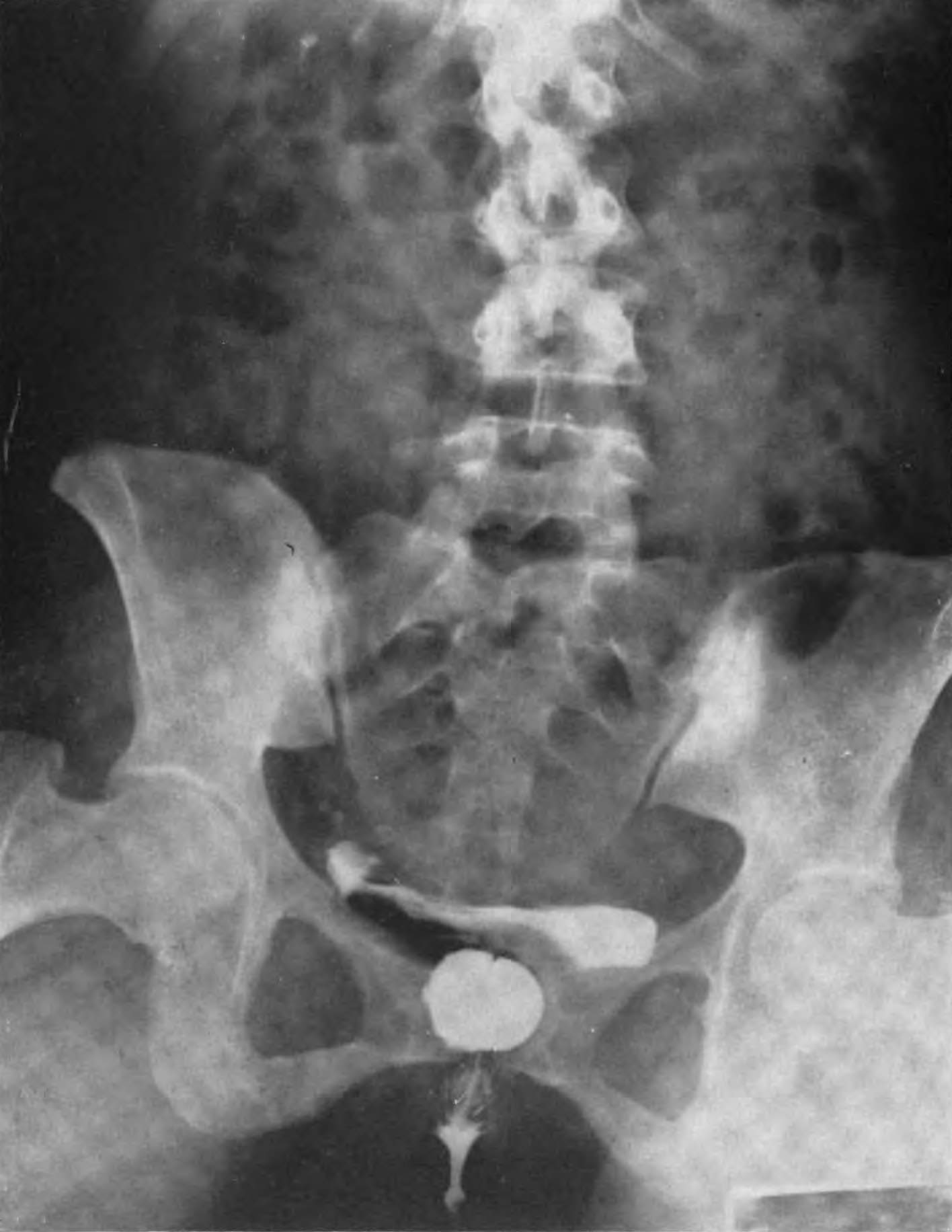
Another view of a urethral diverticulum seen on urethrogram

Urethral diverticulum is often an incidental finding. It can be diagnosed using magnetic resonance imaging and/or micturating cystourethrography. Other studies that can be used to diagnose urethral diverticulum include intravenous urography, urethroscopy, and/or ultrasound. Conditions that should be distinguished from urethral diverticulum in a differential diagnosis include overactive bladder, Gartner's duct cyst, Gartner's duct abscess, ectopic caeco-ureterocele, interstitial cystitis, pelvic inflammatory disease, endometriosis, and cancer.

== Treatment ==
The primary treatment for urethral diverticulum is surgical. In women, the surgery is conducted transvaginally, usually when there is no acute inflammation to better aid dissection of the delicate tissues.

== Prognosis ==
Left untreated, urethral diverticulum can cause significant morbidity (sickness).

During surgery, there is a risk for complications due to the highly vascular nature of the tissue. The urethral sphincters and its smooth muscle, as well as the neck of the bladder, can be injured regardless of the surgical approach. Other complications from surgery can include urinary incontinence, stress incontinence, a urethrovaginal fistula, or recurrent diverticula. Horseshoe-shaped diverticula and diverticula that completely surround the urethra are both associated with worse outcomes, as are those located close to the bladder, and large (over 3–4 cm) diverticula.

== Epidemiology ==
The incidence of urethral diverticulum has been increasing in the 2000s, likely due to increasing diagnosis and detection of the condition. It is estimated to be present in as low as 0.02% of all women and as high as 6% of all women, and 40% of women with lower urinary tract symptoms. Most symptomatic urethral diverticula are present in women from 30 to 60 years old.

84% of periurethral masses are due to urethral diverticula.

== In men ==
Urethral diverticulum can occur in men, and can cause complications including urethral stones and urinary tract infections.
