= Sexually transmitted infection =

Infection transmitted through human sexual behavior

- Other names: Sexually transmitted disease (STD); Venereal disease (VD)
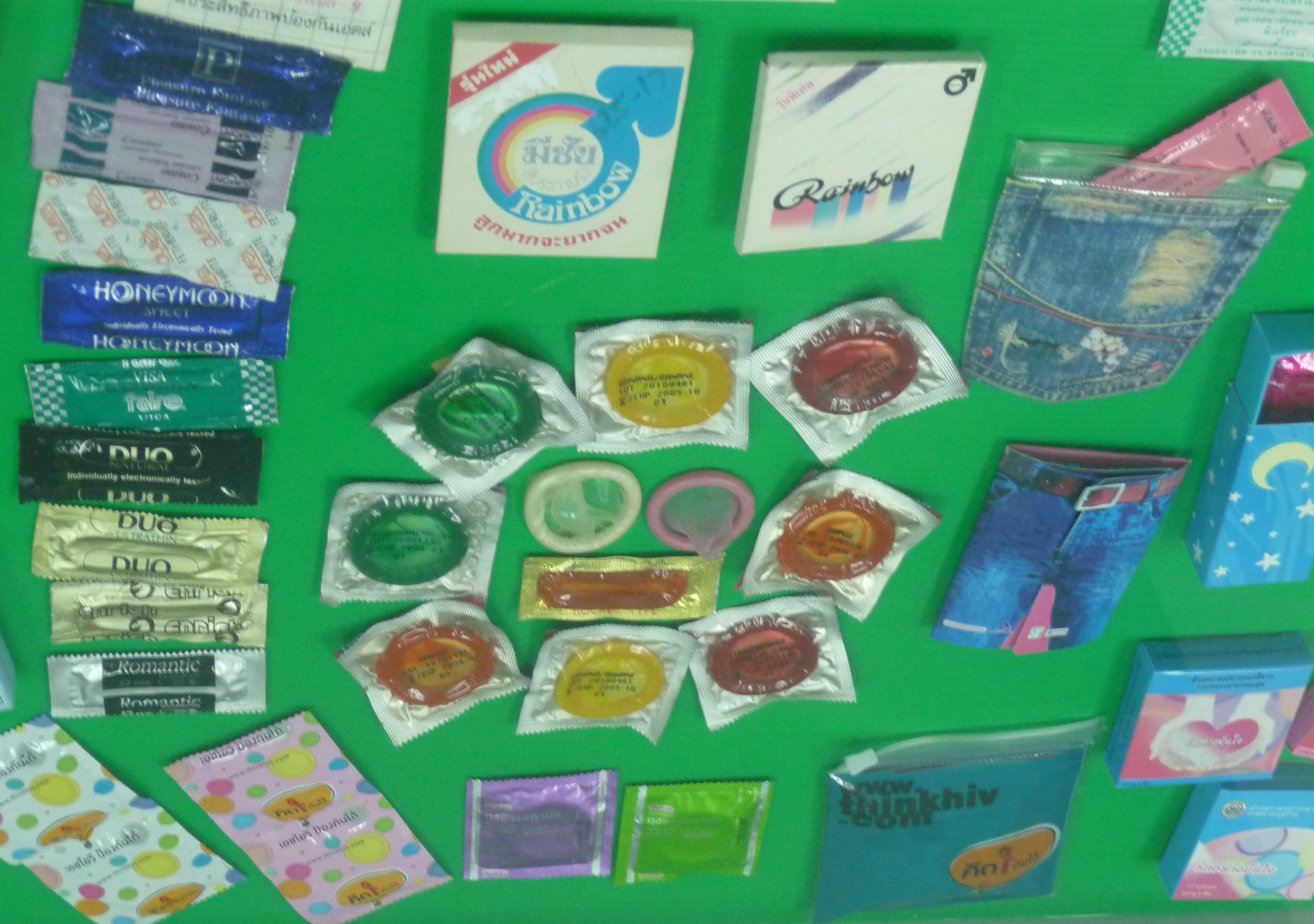
- Condom Museum, Bangkok
- Specialty: Infectious disease
- Symptoms: None, vaginal discharge, penile discharge, ulcers on or around the genitals, pelvic pain
- Complications: Infertility
- Causes: Infections commonly spread by sex
- Prevention: Sexual abstinence, vaccinations, condoms
- Frequency: 1.1 billion (STIs other than HIV/AIDS, 2015)
- Deaths: 108,000 (STIs other than HIV/AIDS, 2015)

A sexually transmitted infection (STI), also known as a sexually transmitted disease (STD) or venereal disease (VD), is an infection that is spread by sexual activity, especially vaginal intercourse, anal sex, oral sex, or sometimes manual sex. STIs often do not initially cause symptoms, which results in a risk of transmitting them to others. The term sexually transmitted infection is generally preferred over sexually transmitted disease or venereal disease, as it includes cases with no symptomatic disease. Symptoms and signs of STIs may include vaginal discharge, penile discharge, ulcers on or around the genitals, and pelvic pain. Some STIs can cause infertility.

Bacterial STIs include chlamydia, gonorrhea, and syphilis. Viral STIs include genital warts, genital herpes, and HIV/AIDS. Parasitic STIs include trichomoniasis. Most STIs, such as syphilis, gonorrhea, chlamydia and trichomoniasis, are treatable and curable. Others, such as HIV/AIDS and genital herpes, are not curable. Some vaccinations have been known to decrease the risk of certain infections including hepatitis B and a few types of HPV. Using condoms, having a smaller number of sexual partners, and being in a relationship in which each person only has sex with the other are all safe sex practises that decreases the risk of contracting STIs. Comprehensive sex education may also be useful.

STI diagnostic tests are usually easily available in the developed world, but they are often unavailable in the developing world. There is often shame and stigma associated with STIs. In 2015, STIs (excluding HIV) resulted in 108,000 deaths worldwide. Globally, in 2015, about 1.1 billion people had STIs other than HIV/AIDS. About 500 million have syphilis, gonorrhea, chlamydia or trichomoniasis. At least an additional 530 million have genital herpes, and 290 million women have human papillomavirus. Historical documentation of STIs in antiquity dates back to at least the Ebers Papyrus (c. 1550 BCE) and the Hebrew Bible/Old Testament (8th/7th C. BCE).

== Signs and symptoms ==
Not all STIs are symptomatic, and symptoms may not appear immediately after infection. In some instances a disease can be carried with no symptoms, which leaves a greater risk of passing it on to others. Depending on the disease, some untreated STIs can lead to infertility, chronic pain or death.

The presence of an STI in prepubescent children may indicate sexual abuse.

== Cause ==
=== Transmission ===
A sexually transmitted infection present in a pregnant woman may be passed on to the infant before or after birth.

Risk of transmission per unprotected sexual act with an infected person
Activity	Known risks	Possible
Performing oral sex on a penis	Throat chlamydia; Throat gonorrhea (25–30%); Herpes (rare); HPV; Syphilis (1%)	Hepatitis B (low risk); HIV (0.01%); Hepatitis C (unknown)
Performing oral sex on a vagina	Herpes; HPV	Throat gonorrhea; Throat chlamydia
Having oral sex performed on one's penis	Chlamydia; Gonorrhea; Herpes; Syphilis (1%)	HPV
Having oral sex performed on one's vagina	Herpes	HPV; Bacterial vaginosis; Gonorrhea
Vaginal sex—insertive	Chlamydia (30–50%); Crabs; Scabies; Gonorrhea (22%); Hepatitis B; Herpes (0.07% for HSV-2); HIV (0.05%); HPV (high: around 40–50%); Mycoplasma hominis infection; Mycoplasma genitalium; Syphilis; Trichomoniasis; Ureaplasma infection	Hepatitis C
Vaginal sex—receptive	Chlamydia (30–50%); Crabs; Scabies; Gonorrhea (47%); Hepatitis B (50–70%); Herpes; HIV (0.1%); HPV (high; around 40–50%); Mycoplasma hominis infection; Syphilis; Trichomoniasis; Ureaplasma infection	Hepatitis C
Anal sex—insertive	Chlamydia; Crabs; Scabies (40%); Gonorrhea; Hepatitis B; Herpes; HIV (0.62%); HPV; Syphilis (14%)	Hepatitis C
Anal sex—receptive	Chlamydia; Crabs; Scabies; Gonorrhea; Hepatitis B; Herpes; HIV (1.7%); HPV; Syphilis (1.4%)	Hepatitis C
Anilingus	Amoebiasis; Cryptosporidiosis (1%); Giardiasis; Hepatitis A(1%); Shigellosis (1%)	HPV (1%)

=== Bacterial ===
- Chancroid (Haemophilus ducreyi)
- Chlamydia (Chlamydia trachomatis)
- Gonorrhea (Neisseria gonorrhoeae)
- Granuloma inguinale or (Klebsiella granulomatis)
- Mycoplasma genitalium
- Mycoplasma hominis
- Syphilis (Treponema pallidum)
- Ureaplasma infection

=== Viral ===
Herpes simplex cytopathic effects on a cervical Pap test (Pap stain): multinucleation, nuclear molding, chromatin margination, and a Cowdry type A inclusion. Accompanying neutrophils are common but nonspecific.

- Viral hepatitis (hepatitis B virus)—saliva, venereal fluids.
  (Note: hepatitis A and hepatitis E are transmitted via the fecal–oral route; hepatitis C is rarely sexually transmittable, and the route of transmission of hepatitis D (only if infected with B) is uncertain, but may include sexual transmission.)
- Herpes simplex (Herpes simplex virus 1, 2) skin and mucosal, transmissible with or without visible blisters
- HIV (Human Immunodeficiency Virus)—venereal fluids, semen, breast milk, blood
- HPV (Human Papillomavirus)—skin and mucosal contact. 'High risk' types of HPV cause almost all cervical cancers, as well as some anal, penile, and vulvar cancer. Some other types of HPV cause genital warts.
- Molluscum contagiosum (molluscum contagiosum virus MCV)—close contact
- Zika virus

=== Parasites ===
- Crab louse, colloquially known as "crabs" or "pubic lice" (Pthirus pubis). The infestation and accompanying inflammation is Pediculosis pubis
- Scabies (Sarcoptes scabiei)
- Trichomoniasis (Trichomonas vaginalis), colloquially known as "trich"

=== Fungal ===
Trichophyton mentagrophytes type VII is an emerging fungal infection (tinea or ringworm) that is spread through sexual activity and other close contact.

=== Main types ===
Sexually transmitted infections include:

- Chlamydia is a sexually transmitted infection caused by the bacterium Chlamydia trachomatis. In women, symptoms may include abnormal vaginal discharge, burning during urination, and bleeding in between periods, although most women do not experience any symptoms. Symptoms in men include pain when urinating, and abnormal discharge from their penis. If left untreated in both men and women, chlamydia can infect the urinary tract and potentially lead to pelvic inflammatory disease (PID). PID can cause serious problems during pregnancy and even has the potential to cause infertility. It can cause a woman to have a potentially deadly ectopic pregnancy, in which the egg implants outside of the uterus. However, chlamydia can be cured with antibiotics.
- The two most common forms of herpes are caused by infection with herpes simplex virus (HSV). HSV-1 is typically acquired orally and causes cold sores; HSV-2 is usually acquired during sexual contact and affects the genitals; however, either strain may affect either site. Some people are asymptomatic or have very mild symptoms. Those that do experience symptoms usually notice them 2 to 20 days after exposure which lasts 2 to 4 weeks. Symptoms can include small fluid-filled blisters, headaches, backaches, itching or tingling sensations in the genital or anal area, pain during urination, flu like symptoms, swollen glands, or fever. Herpes is spread through skin contact with a person infected with the virus. The virus affects the areas where it entered the body. This can occur through kissing, vaginal intercourse, oral sex or anal sex. The virus is most infectious during times when there are visible symptoms; however, those who are asymptomatic can still spread the virus through skin contact. The initial infection and symptoms are usually the most severe because the body does not have any antibodies built up. After the primary attack, one might have recurring attacks that are milder or might not even have future attacks. There is no cure for the disease but there are antiviral medications that treat its symptoms and lower the risk of transmission (Valtrex). Although HSV-1 is typically the "oral" version of the virus, and HSV-2 is typically the "genital" version of the virus, a person with HSV-1 orally can transmit that virus to their partner genitally. The virus, either type, will settle into either a nerve bundle at the top of the spine, producing the "oral" outbreak, or a second nerve bundle at the base of the spine, producing the genital outbreak.
- The human papillomavirus (HPV) is the most common STI in the United States. There are more than 40 different strands of HPV and many do not cause any health problems. In 90% of cases, the body's immune system clears the infection naturally within two years. Some cases may not be cleared and can lead to genital warts (bumps around the genitals that can be small or large, raised or flat, or shaped like cauliflower) or cervical cancer and other HPV related cancers. Symptoms might not show up until advanced stages. It is important for women to get pap smears in order to check for and treat cancers. There are also two vaccines available for women (Cervarix and Gardasil) that protect against the types of HPV that cause cervical cancer. HPV can be passed through genital-to-genital contact as well as during oral sex. The infected partner might not have any symptoms.
- Gonorrhea is caused by bacterium that lives on moist mucous membranes in the urethra, vagina, rectum, mouth, throat, and eyes. The infection can spread through contact with the penis, vagina, mouth, or anus. Symptoms of gonorrhea usually appear two to five days after contact with an infected partner; however, some men might not notice symptoms for up to a month. Symptoms in men include burning and pain while urinating, increased urinary frequency, discharge from the penis (white, green, or yellow in color), red or swollen urethra, swollen or tender testicles, or sore throat. Symptoms in women may include vaginal discharge, burning or itching while urinating, painful sexual intercourse, severe pain in lower abdomen (if infection spreads to fallopian tubes), or fever (if infection spreads to fallopian tubes); however, many women do not show any symptoms. Antibiotic resistant strains of Gonorrhea are a significant concern, but most cases can be cured with existing antibiotics.

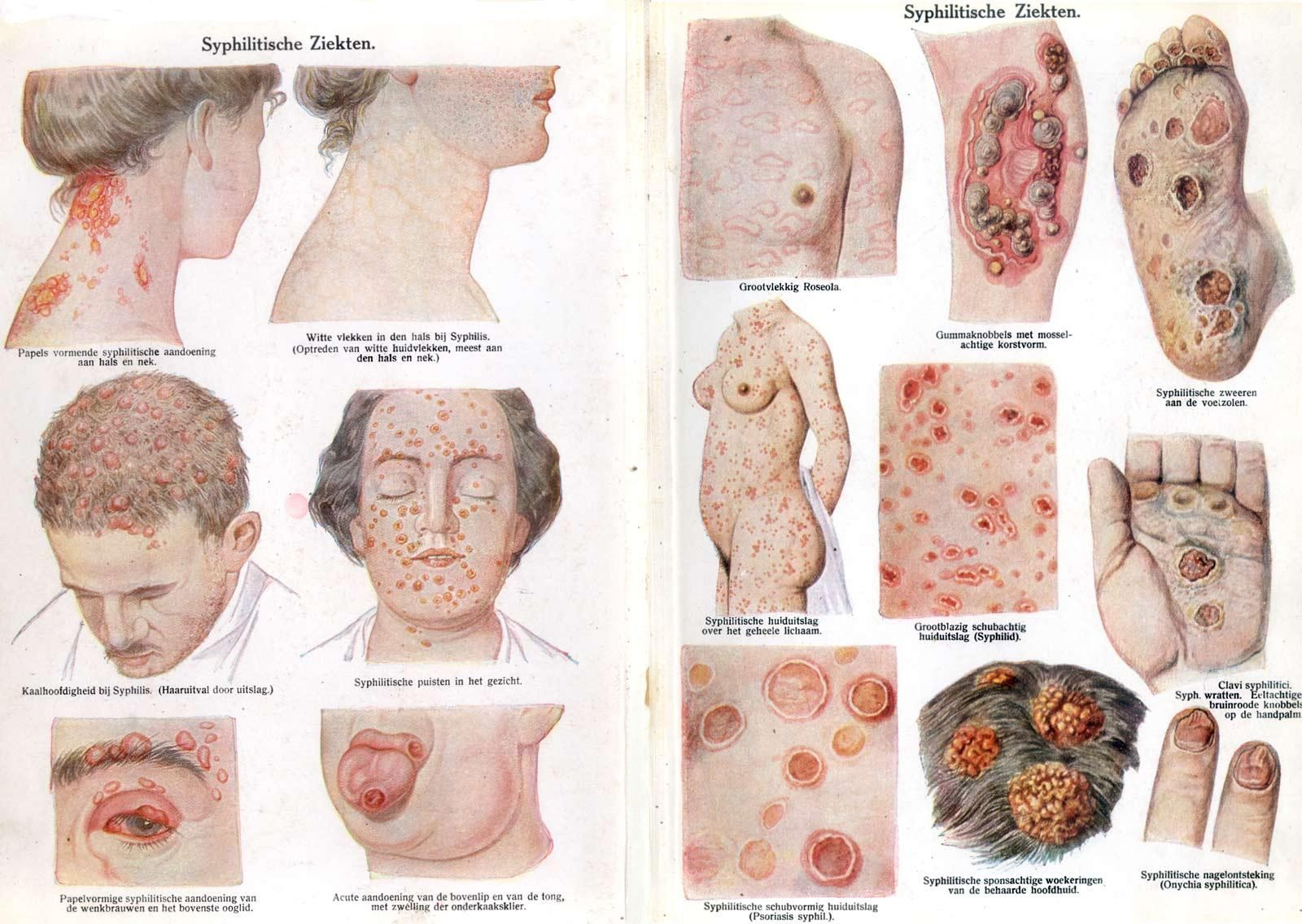
Secondary syphilis

- Syphilis is an STI caused by a bacterium. Untreated, it can lead to complications and death. Clinical manifestations of syphilis include the ulceration of the uro-genital tract, mouth or rectum; if left untreated the symptoms worsen. In recent years, the prevalence of syphilis has declined in Western Europe, but it has increased in Eastern Europe (former Soviet states). A high incidence of syphilis can be found in places such as Cameroon, Cambodia, Papua New Guinea. Syphilis infections are increasing in the United States.
- Trichomoniasis is a common STI that is caused by infection with a protozoan parasite called Trichomonas vaginalis. Trichomoniasis affects both women and men, but symptoms are more common in women. Most patients are treated with an antibiotic called metronidazole, which is very effective.
- HIV (human immunodeficiency virus) damages the body's immune system, which interferes with its ability to fight off disease-causing agents. The virus kills CD4 cells, which are white blood cells that help fight off various infections. HIV is carried in body fluids and is spread by sexual activity. It can also be spread by contact with infected blood, breastfeeding, childbirth, and from mother to child during pregnancy. When HIV is at its most advanced stage, an individual is said to have AIDS (acquired immunodeficiency syndrome). There are different stages of the progression of and HIV infection. The stages include primary infection, asymptomatic infection, symptomatic infection, and AIDS. In the primary infection stage, an individual will have flu-like symptoms (headache, fatigue, fever, muscle aches) for about two weeks. In the asymptomatic stage, symptoms usually disappear, and the patient can remain asymptomatic for years. When HIV progresses to the symptomatic stage, the immune system is weakened and has a low cell count of CD4+ T cells. When the HIV infection becomes life-threatening, it is called AIDS. People with AIDS fall prey to opportunistic infections and die as a result. When the disease was first discovered in the 1980s, those who had AIDS were not likely to live longer than a few years. There are now antiretroviral drugs (ARVs) available to treat HIV infections. There is no known cure for HIV or AIDS but the drugs help suppress the virus. By suppressing the amount of virus in the body, people can lead longer and healthier lives. Even though their virus levels may be low they can still spread the virus to others.

=== Viruses in semen ===
Twenty-seven different viruses have been identified in semen. Information on whether or not transmission occurs or whether the viruses cause disease is uncertain. Some of these microbes are known to be sexually transmitted.

== Pathophysiology ==
Many STIs are (more easily) transmitted through the mucous membranes of the penis, vulva, rectum, urinary tract and (less often—depending on type of infection) the mouth, throat, respiratory tract and eyes. The visible membrane covering the head of the penis is a mucous membrane, though it produces no mucus (similar to the lips of the mouth). Mucous membranes differ from skin in that they allow certain pathogens into the body. The amount of contact with infective sources which causes infection varies with each pathogen but in all cases, a disease may result from even light contact from fluid carriers like venereal fluids onto a mucous membrane.

Some STIs such as HIV can be transmitted from mother to child either during pregnancy or while breastfeeding. Healthcare professionals suggest safer sex, such as the use of condoms, as a reliable way of decreasing the risk of contracting sexually transmitted infections during sexual activity, but safer sex cannot be considered to provide complete protection from an STI. The transfer of and exposure to bodily fluids, such as blood transfusions and other blood products, sharing injection needles, needle-stick injuries (when medical staff are inadvertently jabbed or pricked with needles during medical procedures), sharing tattoo needles, and childbirth are other avenues of transmission. These different means put certain groups, such as medical workers, and haemophiliacs and drug users, particularly at risk.

It is possible to be an asymptomatic carrier of sexually transmitted infections. In particular, sexually transmitted infections in women often cause the serious condition of pelvic inflammatory disease.

== Diagnosis ==
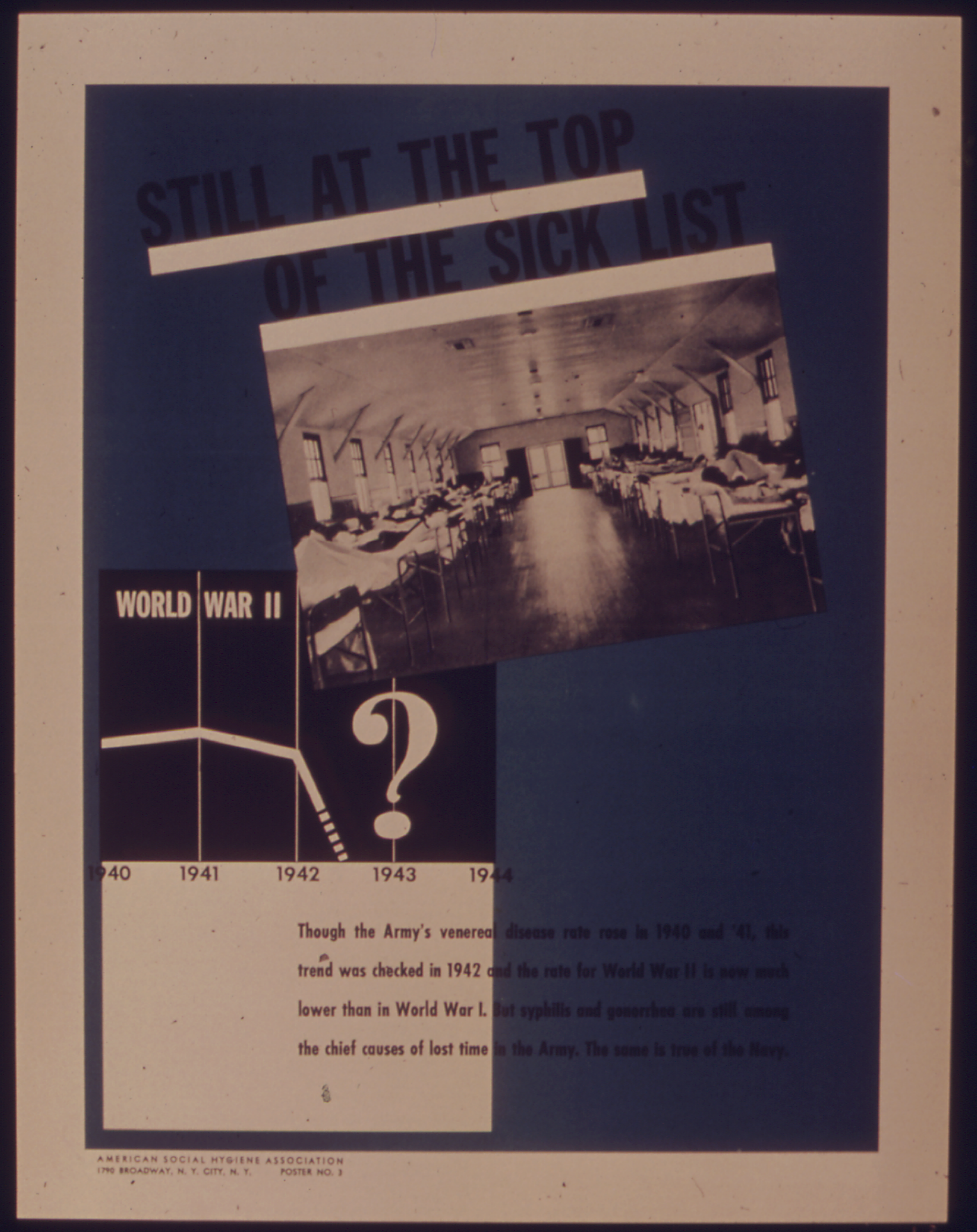
World War II US Army poster warning of venereal disease

Testing may be for a single infection, or consist of a number of tests for a range of STIs, including tests for syphilis, trichomonas, gonorrhea, chlamydia, herpes, hepatitis, and HIV. No procedure tests for all infectious agents.

STI tests may be used for a number of reasons:

- as a diagnostic test to determine the cause of symptoms or illness
- as a screening test to detect asymptomatic or presymptomatic infections
- as a check that prospective sexual partners are free of disease before they engage in sex without safer sex precautions (for example, when starting a long term mutually monogamous sexual relationship, in fluid bonding, or for procreation).
- as a check prior to or during pregnancy, to prevent harm to the baby
- as a check after birth, to check that the baby has not caught an STI from the mother
- to prevent the use of infected donated blood or organs
- as part of the process of contact tracing from a known infected individual
- as part of mass epidemiological surveillance

Early identification and treatment results in less chance to spread disease, and for some conditions may improve the outcomes of treatment. There is often a window period after initial infection during which an STI test will be negative. During this period, the infection may be transmissible. The duration of this period varies depending on the infection and the test. Diagnosis may also be delayed by reluctance of the infected person to seek a medical professional. One report indicated that people turn to the Internet rather than to a medical professional for information on STIs to a higher degree than for other sexual problems.

=== Classification ===
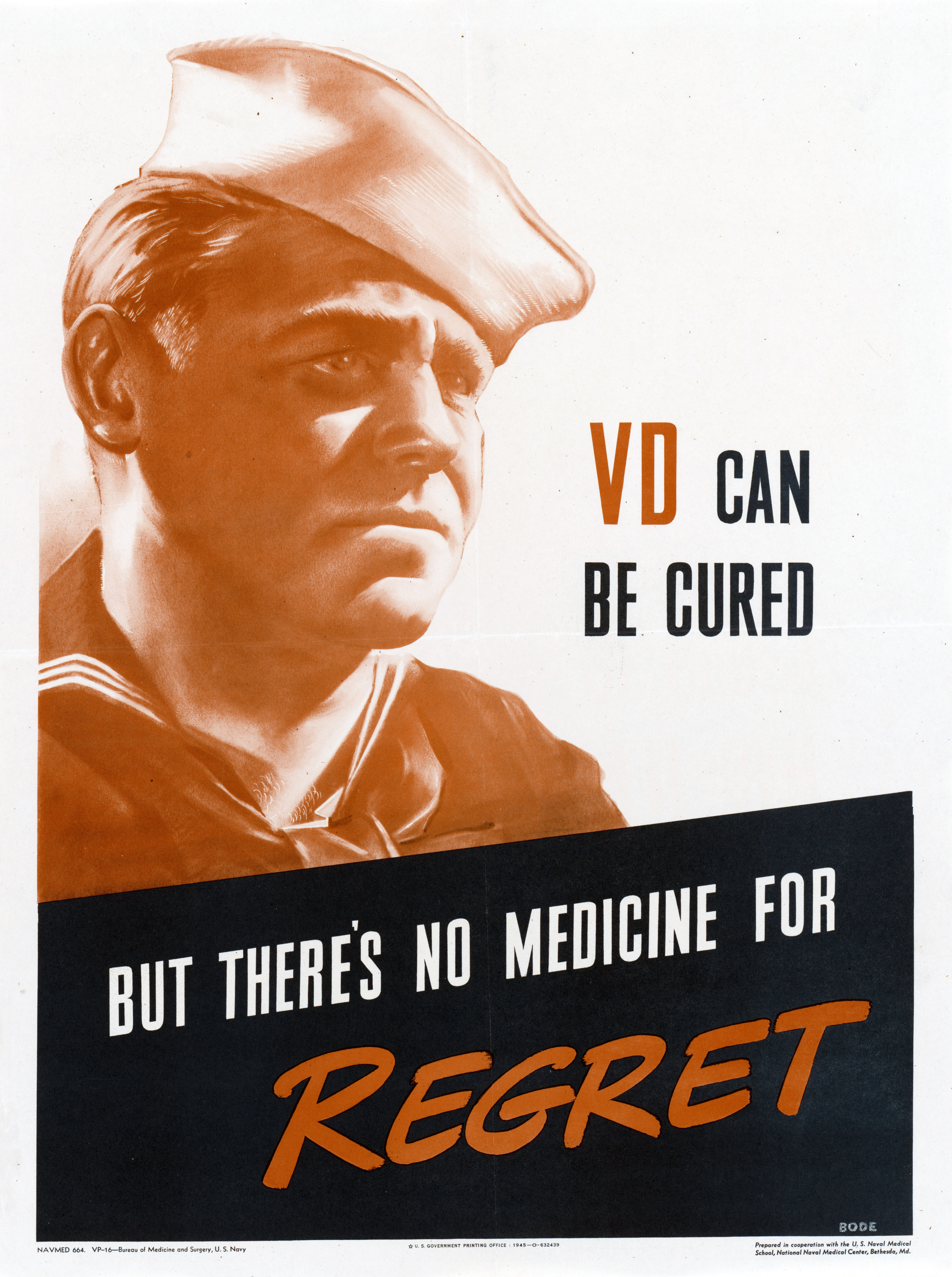
A poster from the Office for Emergency Management, Office of War Information, 1941–1945

Until the 1990s, STIs were commonly known as venereal diseases, an antiquated euphemism derived from the Latin venereus, being the adjectival form of Venus, the Roman goddess of love. However, in the post-classical education era the euphemistic effect was entirely lost, and the common abbreviation "VD" held only negative connotations. Other former euphemisms for STIs include "blood diseases" and "social diseases". The World Health Organization (WHO) has recommended the more inclusive term sexually transmitted infection since 1999.

== Prevention ==
Strategies for reducing STI risk include: vaccination, mutual monogamy, reducing the number of sexual partners, and abstinence. Also potentially helpful is behavioral counseling for sexually active adolescents and for adults who are at increased risk. Such interactive counseling, which can be resource-intensive, is directed at a person's risk, the situations in which risk occurs, and the use of personalized goal-setting strategies.

The most effective way to prevent sexual transmission of STIs is to avoid contact of body parts or fluids which can lead to transfer with an infected partner. Not all sexual activities involve contact: cybersex, phone sex or masturbation from a distance are methods of avoiding contact. Proper use of condoms reduces contact and risk. Although a condom is effective in limiting exposure, some disease transmission may occur even with a condom.

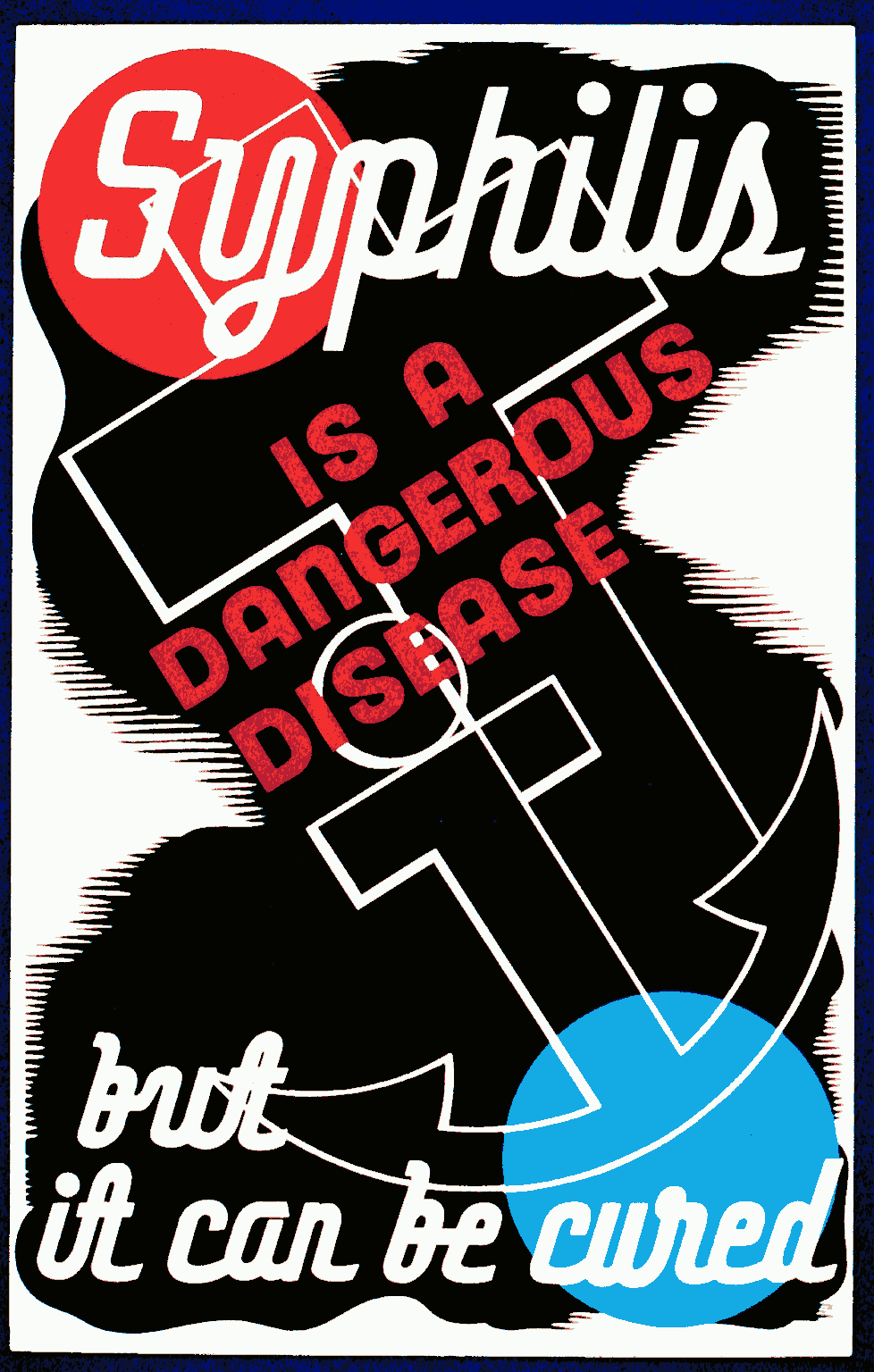
"Syphilis is a dangerous disease, but it can be cured". Poster encouraging treatment. Published between 1936 and 1938.

Both partners can get tested for STIs before initiating sexual contact, or before resuming contact if a partner engaged in contact with someone else. Many infections are not detectable immediately after exposure, so enough time must be allowed between possible exposures and testing for the tests to be accurate. Certain STIs, particularly certain persistent viruses like HPV, may be impossible to detect.

Some treatment facilities use in-home test kits and have the person return the test for follow-up. Other facilities strongly encourage that those previously infected return to ensure that the infection has been eliminated. Novel strategies to foster re-testing have been the use of text messaging and email as reminders. These types of reminders are now used in addition to phone calls and letters. After obtaining a sexual history, a healthcare provider can encourage risk reduction by providing prevention counseling. Prevention counseling is most effective if provided in a nonjudgmental and empathetic manner appropriate to the person's culture, language, gender, sexual orientation, age, and developmental level. Prevention counseling for STIs is usually offered to all sexually active adolescents and to all adults who have received a diagnosis, have had an STI in the past year, or have multiple sex partners.

=== Vaccines ===
Vaccines are available that protect against some viral STIs, such as hepatitis A, hepatitis B, and some types of HPV. Vaccination before initiation of sexual contact is advised to assure maximal protection. The development of vaccines to protect against gonorrhea is ongoing.

=== Condoms ===
Condoms and female condoms only provide protection when used properly as a barrier, and only to and from the area that they cover. Uncovered areas are still susceptible to many STIs.

In the case of HIV, sexual transmission routes almost always involve the penis, as HIV cannot spread through unbroken skin; therefore, properly shielding the penis with a properly worn condom from the vagina or anus effectively stops HIV transmission. An infected fluid to broken skin borne direct transmission of HIV would not be considered "sexually transmitted", but can still theoretically occur during sexual contact. This can be avoided simply by not engaging in sexual contact when presenting open, bleeding wounds.

Other STIs, even viral infections, can be prevented with the use of latex, polyurethane or polyisoprene condoms as a barrier. Some microorganisms and viruses are small enough to pass through the pores in natural skin condoms but are still too large to pass through latex or synthetic condoms.

Proper male condom usage entails:

- Not putting the condom on too tight at the tip by leaving 1.5 centimeters (0.6 in) room for ejaculation. Putting the condom on too tightly can and often does lead to failure.
- Wearing a condom too loose can defeat the barrier
- Avoiding inverting or spilling a condom once worn, whether it has ejaculate in it or not
- If a user attempts to unroll the condom, but realizes they have it on the wrong side, then this condom may not be effective
- Being careful with the condom if handling it with long nails
- Avoiding the use of oil-based lubricants (or anything with oil in it) with latex condoms, as oil can eat holes into them
- Using flavored condoms for oral sex only, as the sugar in the flavoring can lead to yeast infections if used to penetrate

In order to best protect oneself and the partner from STIs, the old condom and its contents are to be treated as infectious and properly disposed of. A new condom is used for each act of intercourse, as multiple usages increase the chance of breakage, defeating the effectiveness as a barrier.

In the case of female condoms, the device consists of two rings, one in each terminal portion. The larger ring should fit snugly over the cervix and the smaller ring remains outside the vagina, covering the vulva. This system provides some protection of the external genitalia.

=== Other ===
The cap was developed after the cervical diaphragm. Both cover the cervix and the main difference between the diaphragm and the cap is that the latter must be used only once, using a new one in each sexual act. The diaphragm, however, can be used more than once. These two devices partially protect against STIs (they do not protect against HIV).

Researchers had hoped that nonoxynol-9, a vaginal microbicide would help decrease STI risk. Trials, however, have found it ineffective and it may put women at a higher risk of HIV infection. There is evidence that vaginal dapivirine probably reduces HIV in women who have sex with men, other types of vaginal microbicides have not demonstrated effectiveness for HIV or STIs.

There is little evidence that school-based interventions such as sexual and reproductive health education programmes on contraceptive choices and condoms are effective on improving the sexual and reproductive health of adolescents. Incentive-based programmes may reduce adolescent pregnancy but more data is needed to confirm this.

== Screening ==
Specific age groups, persons who participate in risky sexual behavior, or those have certain health conditions may require screening. The CDC recommends that sexually active women under the age of 25 and those over 25 at risk should be screened for chlamydia and gonorrhea yearly. Appropriate times for screening are during regular pelvic examinations and preconception evaluations. Nucleic acid amplification tests are the recommended method of diagnosis for gonorrhea and chlamydia. This can be done on urine in both men and women, vaginal or cervical swabs in women, or urethral swabs in men. Screening can be performed:

- to assess the presence of infection and prevent tubal infertility in women
- during the initial evaluation before infertility treatment
- to identify HIV infection
- for men who have sex with men
- for those who may have been exposed to hepatitis C
- for HCV

== Management ==
In the case of rape, the person can be treated prophylacticly with antibiotics.

An option for treating partners of patients (index cases) diagnosed with chlamydia or gonorrhea is patient-delivered partner therapy, which is the clinical practice of treating the sex partners of index cases by providing prescriptions or medications to the patient to take to their partner without the health care provider first examining the partner. In term of preventing reinfection in sexually transmitted infection, treatment with both patient and the sexual partner of patient resulted in more successful than treatment of the patient without the sexual partner. There is no difference in reinfection prevention whether the sexual partner treated with medication without medical examination or after notification by patient.

== Epidemiology ==
Age-standardized, disability-adjusted life years WHO estimates for STIs (excluding HIV) per 100,000 inhabitants in 2004: No data < 60 60–120 120–180 180–240 240–300 300–360 / 360–420 420–480 480–540 540–600 600–1000 > 1000

STI (excluding HIV) deaths per million persons in 2012 0–0 1–1 2–3 4–9 10–18 19–31 32–55 56–139

In 2008, it was estimated that 500 million people were infected with syphilis, gonorrhea, chlamydia or trichomoniasis. At least an additional 530 million people have genital herpes and 290 million women have human papillomavirus (HPV). STIs other than HIV resulted in 142,000 deaths in 2013. In the United States there were 19 million new cases of sexually transmitted infections in 2010.

In 2010, 19 million new cases of sexually transmitted infections occurred in women in the United States. A 2008 CDC study found that 25–40% of U.S. teenage girls has a sexually transmitted infection. Out of a population of almost 295,270,000 people there were 110 million new and existing cases of eight sexually transmitted infections.

Over 400,000 sexually transmitted infections were reported in England in 2017, about the same as in 2016, but there were more than 20% increases in confirmed cases of gonorrhoea and syphilis. Since 2008 syphilis cases have risen by 148%, from 2,874 to 7,137, mostly among men who have sex with men. The number of first cases of genital warts in 2017 among girls aged 15–17 years was just 441, 90% less than in 2009 – attributed to the national HPV immunisation programme.

AIDS is among the leading causes of death in present-day Sub-Saharan Africa. HIV/AIDS is transmitted primarily via unprotected sexual intercourse. More than 1.1 million persons are living with HIV/AIDS in the United States, and it disproportionately impacts African Americans. Hepatitis B is also considered a sexually transmitted infection because it can be spread through sexual contact. The highest rates are found in Asia and Africa and lower rates are in the Americas and Europe. Approximately two billion people worldwide have been infected with the hepatitis B virus.

== History ==
Medieval period

Recent studies suggest the presence of treponematosis in medieval skeletal remains across Europe and Western Asia. Although it is not confirmed, historian Marylynn Salmon claims to have found evidence of syphilis like infections in the Early Medieval Period. Treponematosis is a group of infectious diseases caused by the Treponema bacteria which primarily included the sexually transmitted syphilis and yaws. The symptoms of these bacterial infections produce skin and bone lesions that can be identified through paleopathology. Although archeologists struggle to distinguish which strains of this bacteria were active in the medieval period due to similar symptomatology, it can be theorised that the bacteria responsible for syphilitic infection may have been present in Europe prior to the Columbian exchange. It has been equally as difficult to deduce the presence of syphilis in Medieval literature due to medieval physicians confusion with other known diseases. For example, it is possible that diseases documented as leprosy or scabies were in fact syphilis. This theory is supported by the fact that leprosy cannot be transmitted sexually or across the placenta during pregnancy (syphilis on the other hand can); however, many medieval physicians believed that the transmission of leprosy could be possible through both of these pathways. Therefore, due to the similar symptomatology between two diseases, it may be that medieval medical practitioners viewed them as the same ailment.

Records of gonorrhea infection have been present for at least 700 years and is associated with a Parisian district formerly known as "Le Clapiers", which was famous for high levels of prostitution and sexual promiscuity.

Medieval medical writings

The presence of sexually transmitted infections was known and understood by medical practitioners in medieval times. Warnings given by physicians to limit sexual contact were not uncommon and John Arderne’s writings contain understanding of disease transmission from a pregnant mother to their child, which is suggestive of congenital syphilis. In a story told by the 14th-century travel writer Sir John Mandeville, newly married men from a certain island allowed other men to have intercourse with their brides before themselves as a way to determine if their new wives were poisoned. The primary symptom of the first stage of syphilis is skin lesions, which are much less noticeable in infected women because their outbreak of lesions develops internally. This story further suggests an understanding of sexually transmitted infections that supports the theory that syphilis was present in European communities in the Medieval period. There is also a correlation toward the sexual attitudes of the Catholic Church and the rise in genital deformities caused by disease, which suggests that medieval Christians believed that their ailments were the result of sinful sexual encounters.

The general surgeon John Arderne provides some evidence and illustrations of syphilic infections in the 1300s, including an illustration of a diseased penis that is congruent of symptoms of syphilis. His suggestion of a mercury poultice as a cure for skin infections may also indicate a familiarity with syphilis, as mercury became a popular treatment for syphilis in the early 16th century.

Renaissance

The first recorded syphilis outbreak in Europe occurred in 1494 when it broke out among French troops besieging Naples in the Italian War of 1494–98. The disease may have originated from the Columbian Exchange, although this is a widely debated topic among historians. Most Renaissance writers that documented the disease attribute its rapid spread to the French King Charles VIII's troops travelling throughout Italy. Although the French attempted to shift the blame by calling it the ‘mal de Naples’, the most common term for syphilis at the time was the ‘French disease.’ Other social groups, such as Jews, Moriscos, the poor, and prostitutes were attributed to the pox.

Symptomatology and treatment

Some of the earliest Italian chroniclers of the 'Great Pox' discussed the initial appearance of the disease in depth. The apothecary Luca Landucci wrote in his diary in 1496 that ‘there began a certain sickness that was called the French boils, like a large pock’. A few weeks later he stated, ‘in this time, Florence and its countryside were full of French boils, as was every city in Italy, and they lasted for a long while.’ As historian John Henderson suggests, this reflects the nature of the pox as a serious chronic ailment rather than a dramatic epidemic disease which killed rapidly. In addition, to this, the sickness was known to spread slowly and destroy the body. The Bianchina chronicler of Bologna states that it had ‘eaten [away] the nose and half the face.’ The earliest and most detailed account of the entire course of the disease within the human body was documented by a non-medical man called Ser Tommaso di Silvestro, who contracted the disease in late 1496 and continued to describe his symptoms as they worsened until 1498. It was not until the mid-16th century that commentators started to notice that these symptoms were not continuous, and that patients sometimes had periods of remission that could last for years.

Many of the early chroniclers of the disease were skeptical of any medical treatment. However, some friars and other medical practitioners still attempted bloodletting and herbal remedies in an attempt to purge the body of the ‘morbid matter.’ By the 1500s there were two main treatments that were regularly used by physicians: mercury and guaiacum. Guaiac wood was first mentioned in 1516 and was a hard and resinous wood that was imported from the West Indies. This treatment was considered a wonder drug, but it was very expensive and therefore could only be afforded by the affluent and be administered by a physician. This was sometimes coupled with the stufa sicca or ‘dry stove’ which treated the pain and sores through heat and allowed the patient to sweat out their infection. In contrast, mercury was a common treatment for other skin disorders, such as scabies and lice. This was first used as a treatement for syphilis in 1497. It was applied as an ointment over a period of up to 30 days and was often repeated when the patient relapsed. Although this treatment had serious side effects and was negatively associated with un-trained practitioners, it was the most accessible to the lower class and therefore remained a popular treatment until the 19th century.

Development of hospitals

In 1500 in Bologna a group of citizens came together to convert the existing hospital of St. Lorenzo de’ Guarini into a centre for treating the Great Pox. This was the first documented medical building dedicated to incurable diseases. This led to a widespread development of Incurabili hospitals throughout Italy and Europe, as the public needed a place to house their sick. Often these institutions were religiously affiliated, which was part of a wider trend called the ‘new philanthropy’ of the 16th century in which religious orders extended their help to marginalised individuals such as prostitutes and the extreme poor. It is unclear whether there was a statewide governmental reaction to the Great Pox epidemic, as most of these institutions were privately set up. It was not until 1746 that the first voluntary hospital for STIs was founded in London at London Lock Hospital.

Social impact

The actual mortality rate of syphilis during the 1500s and 1600s has been difficult to determine by historians. This is partially due to the disease becoming associated with shame in the 16th century; therefore, family members may have been hesitant to report a death caused by the French disease. Historian Laura J. McGough did a study on the mortality and infection rates of syphilis in Italy during the 16th and 17th centuries. She found that the deaths between men and women were almost equal, with men taking up 52% of mortalities and women around 48%. However, documentation from Rome’s Incurabili hospital suggests that women made up only 20% of admissions. McGough suggests these statistics are representative of biases towards male patients in early modern healthcare rather than reflective of the disease infecting more men. The majority of women that were admitted to hospitals for syphilis at this time were either wives or widows. The death records of men suggest that the French disease had infected workers in almost every sector of Italian society.

Syphilis quickly became associated with sexual promiscuity, often becoming incorporated into European literary tropes and iconography of female beauty, prostitution and undisciplined masculinity. Because of the stigma surrounding sexuality in 16th-century Europe, women, especially beautiful women, were quickly blamed not only for the spread of the disease, but also for having created the disease within their own bodies. The association with prostitution and sexual deviancy produced a stigma that could quickly damage a patient’s reputation. In early modern London, many patients diagnosed with syphilis lost their jobs or their housing. Non-medical practitioners, self treatment and at home remedies became more popular because it was deemed too shameful for patients to seek the help of trained physicians.

19th and 20th centuries

Treatment was not always voluntary; in the second half of the 19th century, the Contagious Diseases Acts were used to arrest suspected prostitutes under the guise of screening for venereal diseases. In 1924, a number of states concluded the Brussels Agreement, whereby states agreed to provide free or low-cost medical treatment at ports for merchant seamen with STIs. A proponent of these approaches was Nora Wattie, OBE, Venereal Diseases Officer in Glasgow from 1929, who encouraged contact tracing and volunteering for treatment, rather than the prevailing more judgemental view. Wattie published her own research on improving sex education and maternity care.

The first effective treatment for a sexually transmitted infection was salvarsan, a treatment for syphilis. With the discovery of antibiotics, a large number of sexually transmitted infections became easily curable, and this, combined with effective public health campaigns against STIs, led to a public perception during the 1960s and 1970s that they have ceased to be a serious medical threat.

During this period, the importance of contact tracing in treating STIs was recognized. By tracing the sexual partners of infected individuals and testing their contacts for infection, STI clinics could effectively suppress infections in the general population.

In the 1980s, it emerged into the public consciousness that certain sexually transmitted infections, such as genital herpes and HIVs, could not be cured by modern medicine. AIDS, in particular, has a long asymptomatic period—during which time HIV (the human immunodeficiency virus, which causes AIDS) can replicate and the disease can be transmitted to others—followed by a symptomatic period, which leads rapidly to death unless treated. HIV/AIDS entered the United States from Haiti in about 1969. Recognition that AIDS threatened a global pandemic led to public information campaigns and the development of treatments that allowed AIDS to be managed by suppressing the replication of HIV for as long as possible. Contact tracing continues to be an important measure, even when diseases are incurable, as it helps to contain infection.

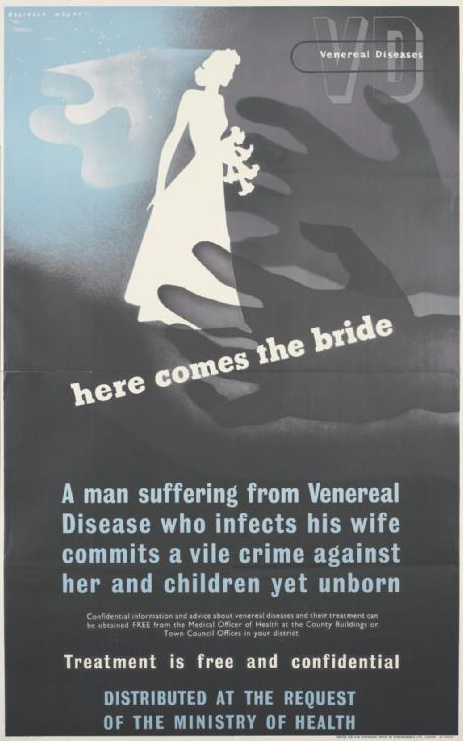
World War II–era British poster urging men to be tested for sexually transmitted infections before marriage

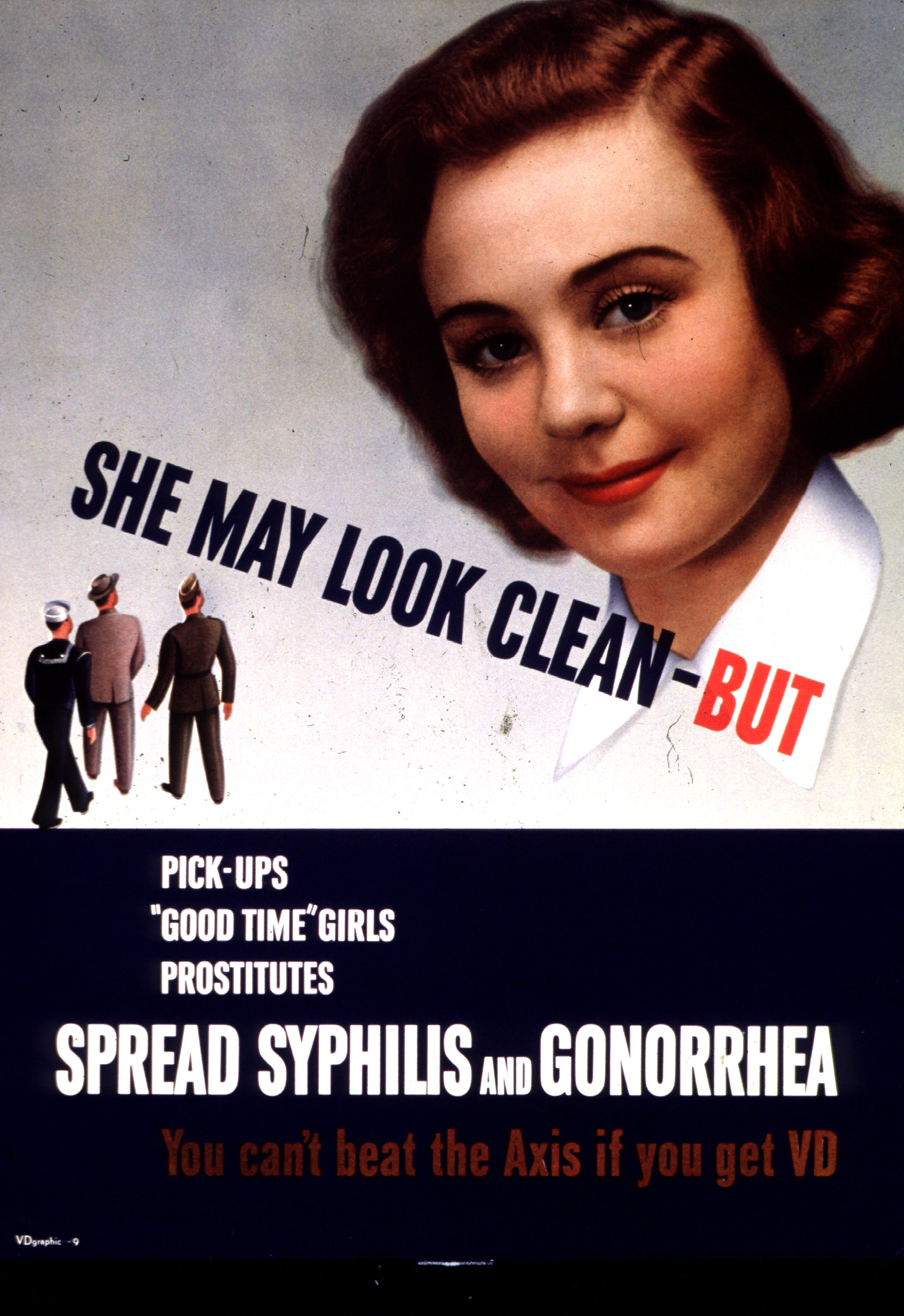
U.S. propaganda poster targeted at World War II servicemen appealed to their patriotism in urging them to protect themselves. The text at the bottom of the poster reads, "You can't beat the Axis if you get VD".

== See also ==
- List of sexually transmitted infections by prevalence
