= Cystitis glandularis =

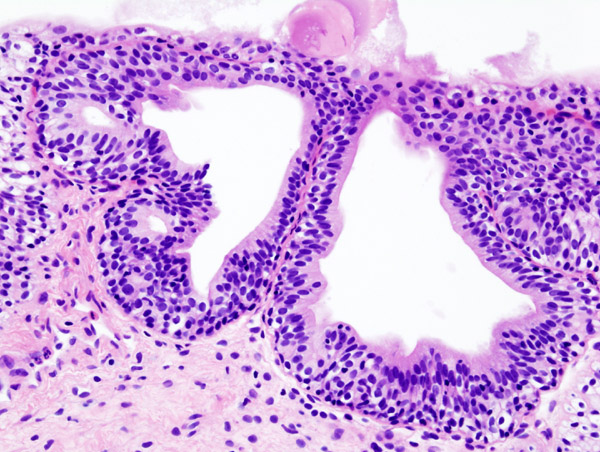
Cystitis glandularis at trigone

Cystitis glandularis is the transformation of mucosal cells lining the urinary bladder. They undergo glandular metaplasia, a process in which irritated tissues take on a different form, in this case that of a gland. The main importance is in the findings of test results, in this case histopathology. They must distinguish a benign metaplastic change from the cancerous condition urothelial cell carcinoma. It is a very common finding in bladder biopsies and cystectomies, and most often found in the trigone area. Cystitis glandularis lesions are usually present as small microscopic foci; however, occasionally it can form raised intramucosal or polypoid lesions. The cystitis glandularis lesions are within the submucosa.

== Types ==
There are two main types of cystitis glandularis, non-mucinous and mucinous (intestinal). The difference is in the cellular production of mucin, a normal feature of colonic and intestinal epithelial cells but not of urothelial cells. Another distinction is made between focal areas and diffuse involvement of the bladder. Whereas focal areas are more common, diffuse involvement is seen in chronically irritated bladders, such as in paraplegics or those with bladder stones or indwelling catheters. Individuals with diffuse intestinal-type cystitis glandularis are at increased risk for developing bladder cancer.

== Related lesions ==
Cystitis glandularis arises from and merges with Von Brunn's nests, which are groups of urothelial cells (cells of urinary tract) within the lamina propria and submucosa, formed from budding from the surface mucosa. They are considered normal. Cystitis cystica is a similar lesion to cystitis glandularis, where the central area of the Von Brunn's nests have degenerated, leaving cystic lesions. Other metaplastic entities in the urinary bladder include squamous metaplasia and nephrogenic adenoma.

== See also ==
- Hemorrhagic cystitis
