= Vesica =

Vesica (pl.: vesicae) is Latin for "bladder", may refer to:

== Anatomy ==
- Vesica, mainly used for the urinary bladder
- Vesica, also used for the gallbladder
- Vesica, in entomology used for a part of the male genitals
- Trigonum vesicae urinariae, Latin for trigone of urinary bladder

== Shapes ==
- Vesica piscis, a shape formed by the intersection of two circles of the same radius
