= List of sexually transmitted infections by prevalence =

Sexually transmitted infections (STIs), also referred to as sexually transmitted diseases (STDs), are infections that are commonly spread by sexual activity, especially vaginal intercourse, anal sex and oral sex. The most prevalent STIs may be carried by a significant fraction of the human population.

STI	Number of people with disease	Notes
Herpes	4,000,000,000	It is estimated that more than two-thirds of the global population has herpes, though it mostly lies dormant.
Human papillomavirus infection	800,000,000	
Chlamydia	450,000,000	
Hepatitis B	356,000,000	Preventable with the Hepatitis B vaccine
Gonorrhea	50,000,000	Globally, 0.8% (women) and 0.6% (men) have gonorrhea.
Syphilis	45,400,000	
HIV/AIDS	36,700,000	
