= Mycoplasma hominis =

Scientific classification
- Domain: Bacteria
- Kingdom: Bacillati
- Phylum: Mycoplasmatota
- Class: Mollicutes
- Order: Mycoplasmatales
- Family: Mycoplasmataceae
- Genus: Mycoplasma
- Species: M. hominis

Binomial name
- Mycoplasma hominis (Freundt 1953) Edward 1955

Species of bacterium

Mycoplasma hominis (also known as Metamycoplasma hominis) is a species of bacteria in the genus Mycoplasma. M. hominis has the ability to penetrate the interior of human cells. Along with ureaplasmas, mycoplasmas are the smallest free-living organisms known.

They have no cell wall and therefore do not Gram stain.

Mycoplasma hominis is associated with pelvic inflammatory disease and bacterial vaginosis. It is also associated with male infertility. This species causes a sexually transmitted infection. It is susceptible to the antibiotic clindamycin.

Growth of "fried egg" colonies on glucose agar medium within 24–72 hours is a characteristic of Mycoplasma hominis.

This pathogen may latently infect the chorionic villi tissues of pregnant women, thereby impacting pregnancy outcome.

== Biology and biochemistry ==
=== Type and morphology ===
Mycoplasma hominis is an opportunistic human mycoplasma species residing in the lower urogenital tract. It is a common human urogenital Mycoplasma species that lacks a cell wall. Due to the absence of the cell wall, M. hominis is innately resistant to β-lactams and to all antibiotics which target the cell wall. Due to the fact that it does not have a cell wall, Mycoplasma hominis does not gram stain although it is surprisingly often described as gram-negative.

The morphology is quite variable and seems to depend, in part, on the age of the culture as the smallest form observed, coming from the elementary body, is 80 nm to 100 nm wide in diameter. Different cell forms have been observed varying from coccoid cells to filaments and irregularly shaped structures with coccoid forms and ring- or disc-shaped cells reigning predominant. Coccal forms of the species are associated with binary fission while fragmentary filaments, and budding cells were also encountered. This fact along with the fact that in different labs, the same strains grew at different rates, leads to the conclusion that cultural conditions have influenced the rate of division and cellular morphology in this species.

The internal components of the much larger cells in the species are also variable. These cells can contain different structures such as ribosome-like granules, nuclear areas of netlike strands, dense cytoplasmic bodies and large vacuoles. These observations indicate multiple modes of reproduction for this organism.

=== Metabolism ===
Analysis of the M. hominis PG21 genome sequence shows that this organism is the second smallest genome among self-replicating free living organisms. Due to their minimal genomes, M. hominis have reduced metabolic capabilities which are characterized by distinct energy-generating pathways. Three energy pathways that M. hominis is capable of going through is Embden-Meyerhoff-Parnas (EMP), arginine dihydrolase and Riboflavin metabolism.

=== Culture growth ===
Mycoplasma hominis, a microorganism without a cell wall, is difficult to detect because it cannot be identified through Gram staining. Culturing it is demanding and time-consuming due to specialized requirements and while direct DNA testing is an option, it's not always highly sensitive, and not all labs possess its capabilities. This likely leads to underreporting of M. hominis infections, causing delayed diagnosis and less favorable treatment outcomes Cells of M. hominis prepared from batch cultures show uniform exponential growth and appear to divide through the process of binary fission with pleomorphic forms appearing upon further incubation. Similar behavior was demonstrated by another laboratory-adapted strain and by three other clinical isolates, making this seem characteristic of the species. M. hominis grows in a variety of defined laboratory media, such as arginine broth and can also be cultivated in water. Growth in this species, as well as most species of Mycoplasma, is driven by anaerobic respiration.

== Role in disease ==
=== Site of localization ===
M. hominis is primarily an opportunistic pathogen of the genitourinary tract. It is capable of infecting human beings as well as non-human primates.

Mycoplasma hominis is more than likely implicated in many different diseases, but its role is unclear for most of them. M. hominis is implicated in pelvic inflammatory disease, which may cause ectopic pregnancy. It prospers in the environment created by other gram negative bacteria implicated in bacterial vaginosis and may be a cause of preterm delivery and miscarriage. It is also implicated in postpartum fever, because it may be a cause of endometritis. M. hominis is also suspected to be the cause of neonatal infections such as conjunctivitis, respiratory distress, fever, meningitis, abscesses, and congenital pneumonia. In adults, M. hominis may be implicated in pharyngitis, septicaemia, lung infections, central nervous system infections, other respiratory tract infections, joint infection, and wound infections. M. hominis infections are usually not seen in healthy adults. Understanding how M. hominis contributes to infections in adult patients, particularly in areas outside the genital tract like the central nervous system (CNS), post-operative wound sites, the chest, and joints, has posed a challenge. Recent data shows an increase in reported post-operative CNS infections caused by Mycoplasma hominis, likely due to the more extensive use of advanced diagnostic methods like PCR and DNA sequencing, especially when routine cultures fail to detect bacterial growth.

=== Incubation period ===
The incubation period of M. hominis is unknown.

=== Treatment ===
Many antibiotics kill bacteria by weakening the cell wall. However, mycoplasma bacteria lack this cellular structure causing some antibiotics, like penicillin, to be ineffective treatment options.

Oral tetracyclines have historically been the drugs of choice for use against urogenital and systemic infections due to M. hominis. In locations and patient populations where tetracycline resistance or treatment failures are common, other drugs such as fluoroquinolones should be considered guided by in vitro susceptibility data when possible.

Recent epidemiologic studies demonstrate that 18% of Mycoplasma hominis are resistant to ciprofloxacin and 61% are resistant to azithromycin. Resistance to minocycline is 6%.

Some infections may be treated by a single antibiotic. In other cases such as severe M. hominis infections occurring in immunocompromised patients, combination of drugs usually active against the mycoplasmas have been recommended. In those cases, guidelines for optimal therapy remain to be established. Current therapeutic considerations are based only upon case reports.

== Genome studies ==
DNA sequence data is incomplete for M. hominis. M. hominis uses an atypical type of energy metabolism, dependent upon the degradation of arginine. Other mycoplasmas lack this characteristic. Determining the genome will provide information that would facilitate the understanding of metabolic reconstitutions.

== See also ==
- Sexually transmitted infection
- Vaginal infection
- Vaginal disease
- List of bacterial vaginosis microbiota
