= Cystitis cystica =

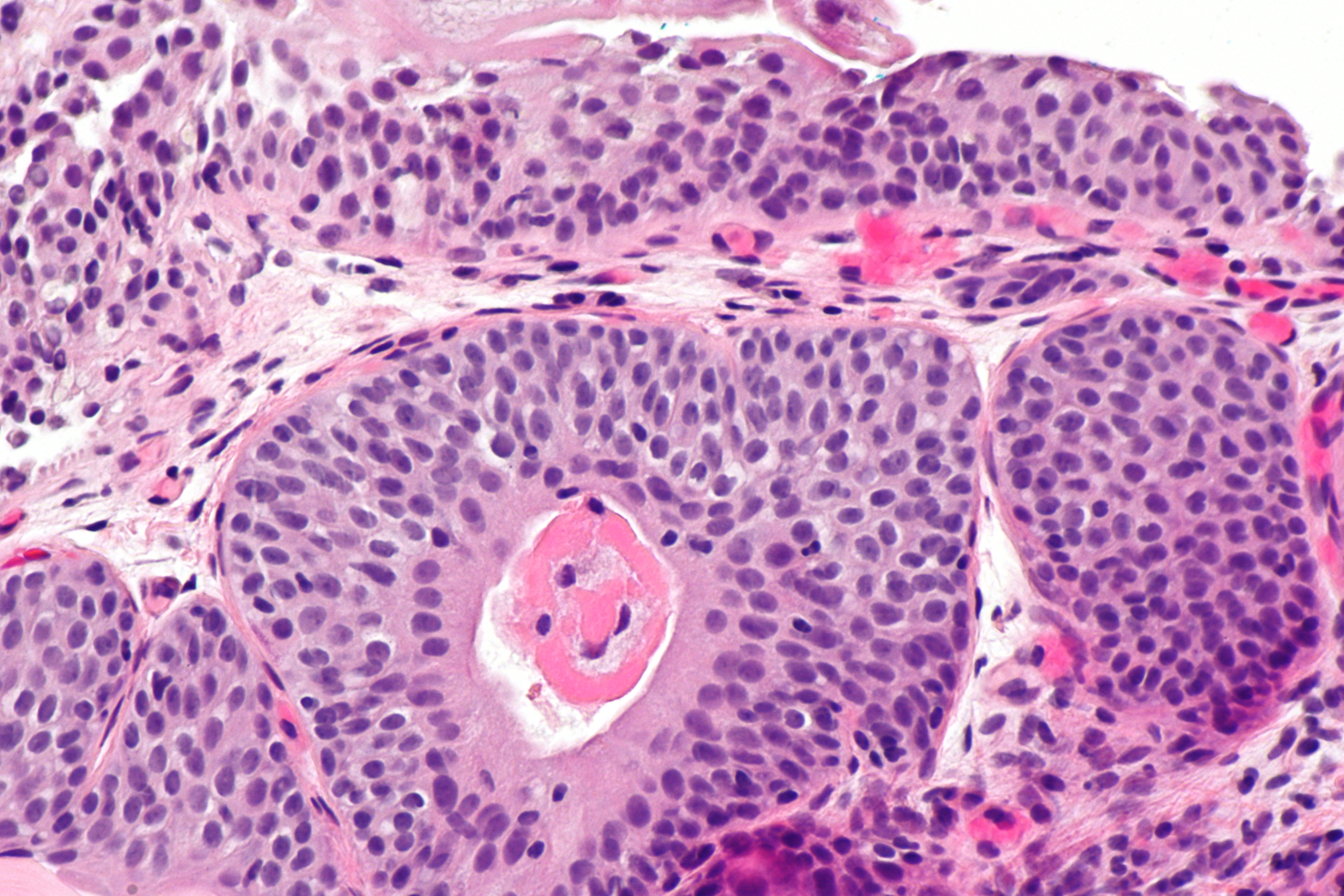
- Micrograph showing cystitis cystica.
- Specialty: Urology

Cystitis cystica is an uncommon chronic reactive inflammatory disease that is believed to be brought on by a tumor, calculi, infection, or obstruction of the urothelium. Cystitis glandularis is a proliferative progression of cystitis cystica that is distinguished by urothelial glandular metaplasia.

== Signs and symptoms ==
The symptoms of cystitis cystica and associated pathologies are not specific. They could exhibit vague symptoms akin to those of numerous other urinary illnesses and ailments. Symptoms include suprapubic or perianal pain, hematuria, urine retention, lower urinary tract symptoms such as incomplete emptying, urgency, and frequency, and obstructive urinary symptoms.

== Causes ==
Although many affected individuals share a common feature of chronic irritation, infection, or inflammation, the exact cause of cystitis cystica remains unknown. Potential causes include chronic Urinary tract infections, in-dwelling catheters, mechanical irritation, chronic bladder outlet obstruction, and neurogenic bladders. Changes in the bladder mucosa caused by diffuse cystitis cystica are often linked to bladder exstrophy.

== Diagnosis ==
A complete blood count, tests for inflammatory mediators, a urinalysis, and a kidney function test are commonly performed examinations. Specifically, a urinalysis is necessary to identify any urinary tract infection or the presence of hematuria, and it should be obtained before starting any antibiotic.

Cystitis cystica cystoscopy features can range from a large bladder cyst or mass to an essentially unremarkable appearance. On the other hand, it usually manifests as several tiny translucent cysts under the mucosa, primarily located at the bladder neck and trigone. Congestion, thickening, irregularity, multiple nodules, or an exophytic polypoidal mass can all be seen in the bladder mucosa. Since cystitis cystica usually has inconclusive cystoscopic and radiological features, a concurrent biopsy is usually done on both the lesion and the mucosal changes.

One trustworthy and non-invasive method to help diagnose cystitis cystica is ultrasonography. Because it measures the thickness of the bladder wall, it is useful in cases of recurrent Urinary tract infections. One study found that, in contrast to simple recurrent UTIs, which typically have a bladder wall thickness of less than 3 mm, cystitis cystica is indicated by values of bladder wall thickness greater than 3 mm.

For a comprehensive assessment of the genitourinary system, computerized tomography (CT) scanning of the urinary tract with and without contrast media (CT urogram) is used. It can detect lesions in the bladder that are large enough to be seen, gauge the thickness of the bladder wall, and look for additional lesions that might be the source of hematuria. Cystitis cystica can show up on a CT urogram as a number of small, rounded filling defects in the bladder wall that range in size from 2 to 5 mm. Lesions can also occasionally appear as a large, tumor-like mass.

== Treatment ==
Since determining the precise cause of cystitis cystica can be difficult, treatment can be complicated. Following diagnosis confirmation, the mainstays of treatment are the elimination of aggravating factors, symptomatic management, antibiotics and chemoprophylaxis, and, in the event that non-pharmacological measures prove ineffective, surgical intervention.

== Outlook ==
Although the exact clinical course of cystitis cystica is unknown, the inflammation associated with the cystitis may subside if the irritant source is eliminated. The mucosal alterations may go away if UTIs are treated effectively and prevented.

== See also ==
- Cystitis glandularis
- Urinary tract infection
