= Metanephric adenoma =

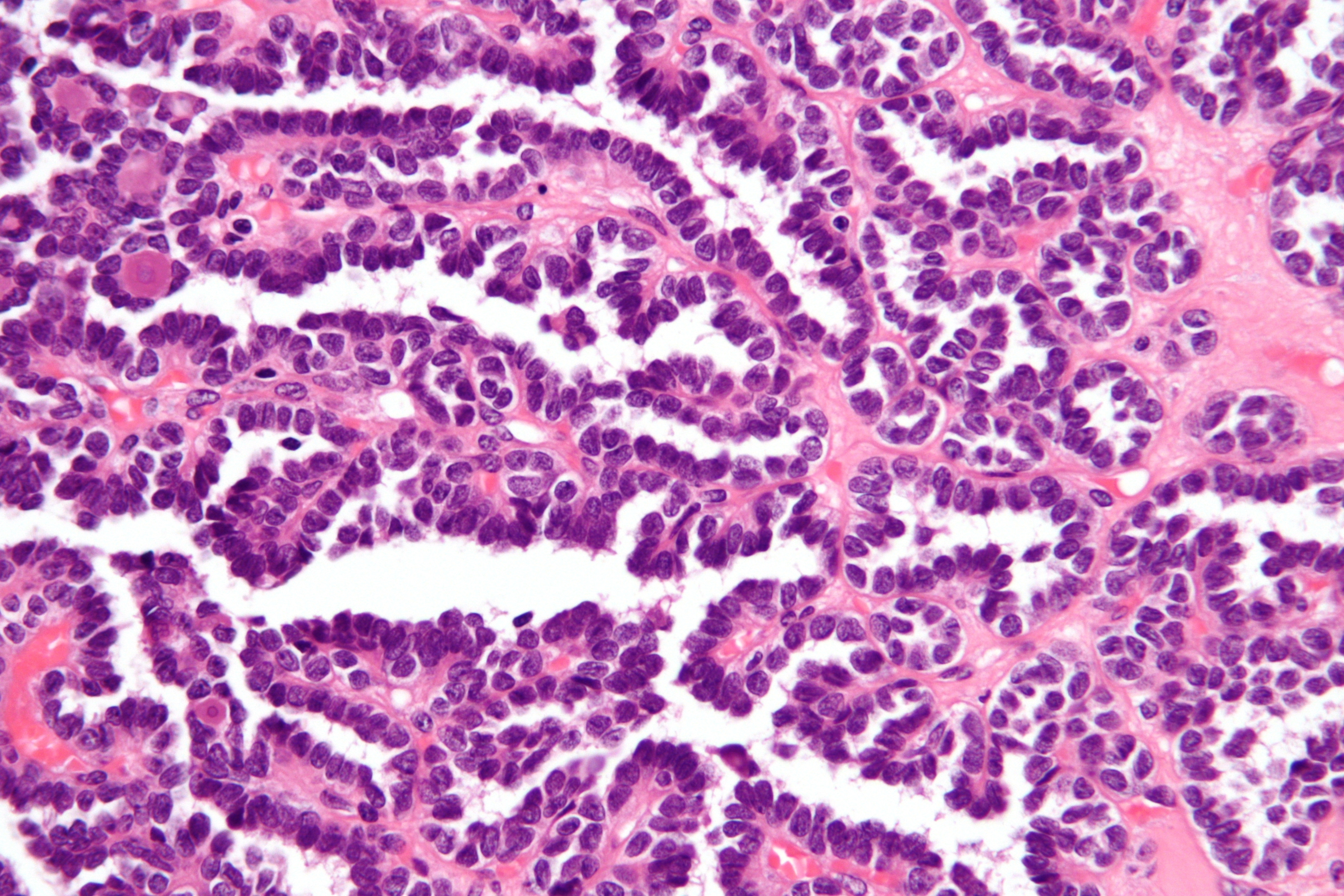
- Micrograph of a metanephric adenoma with structures reminiscent of those seen in papillary renal cell carcinoma. H&E stain.
- Specialty: Oncology

Metanephric adenoma (MA) is a rare, benign tumour of the kidney, that can have a microscopic appearance similar to a nephroblastoma (Wilms tumours), or a papillary renal cell carcinoma.

It should not be confused with the pathologically unrelated, yet similar sounding, mesonephric adenoma.

== Symptoms ==
The symptoms may be similar to those classically associated with renal cell carcinoma, and may include polycythemia, abdominal pain, hematuria and a palpable mass. Mean age at onset is around 40 years with a range of 5 to 83 years and the mean size of the tumour is 5.5 cm with a range 0.3 to 15 cm (1). Polycythemia is more frequent in MA than in any other type of renal tumour. Of further relevance is that this tumour is more commonly calcified than any other kidney neoplasm. Surgery is curative and no other treatment is recommended. There is so far no evidence of metastases or local recurrence.

== Pathology ==
=== Histopathology ===
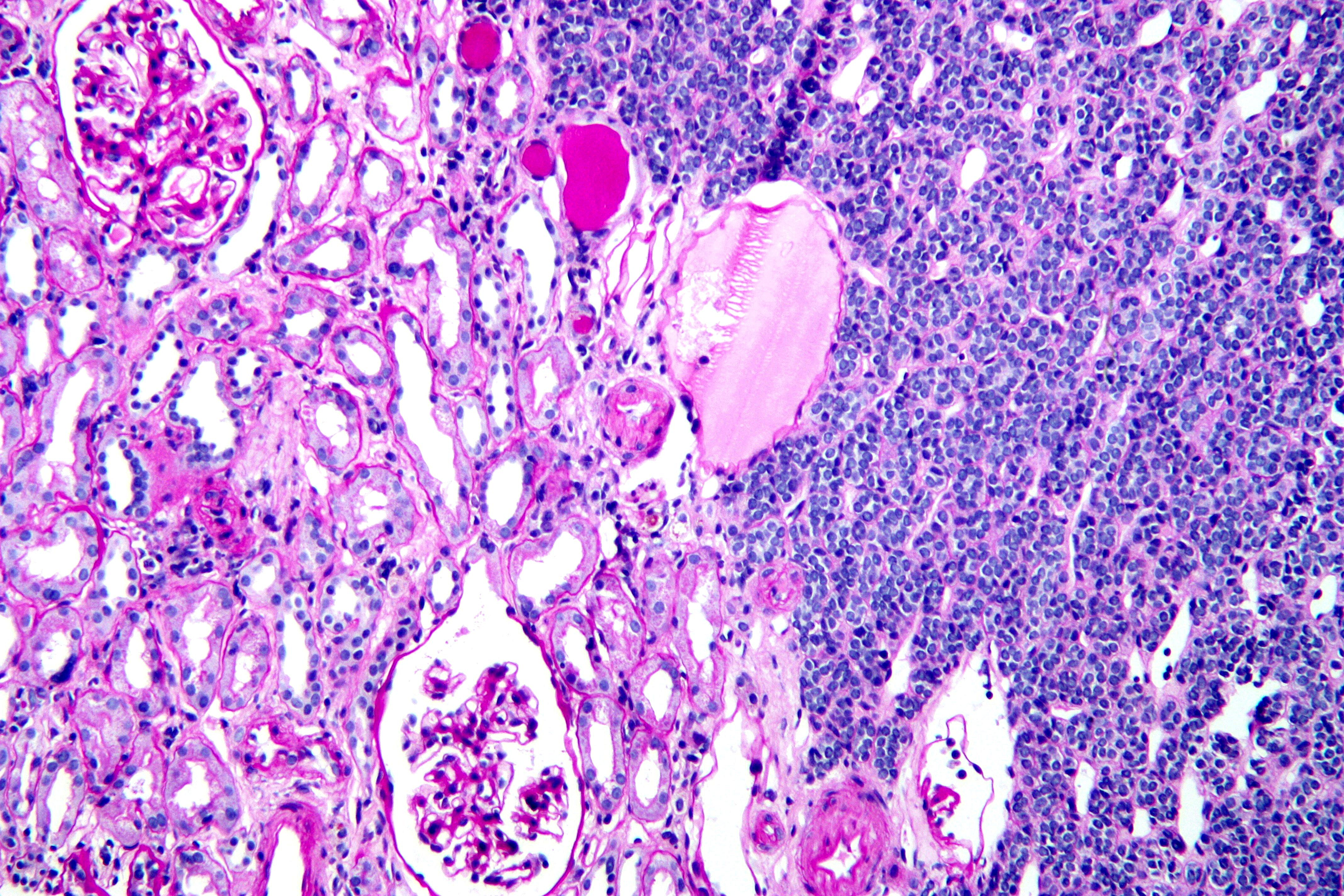
Micrograph of a metanephric adenoma (right of image). Normal kidney is seen on the left. Kidney biopsy. PAS stain.

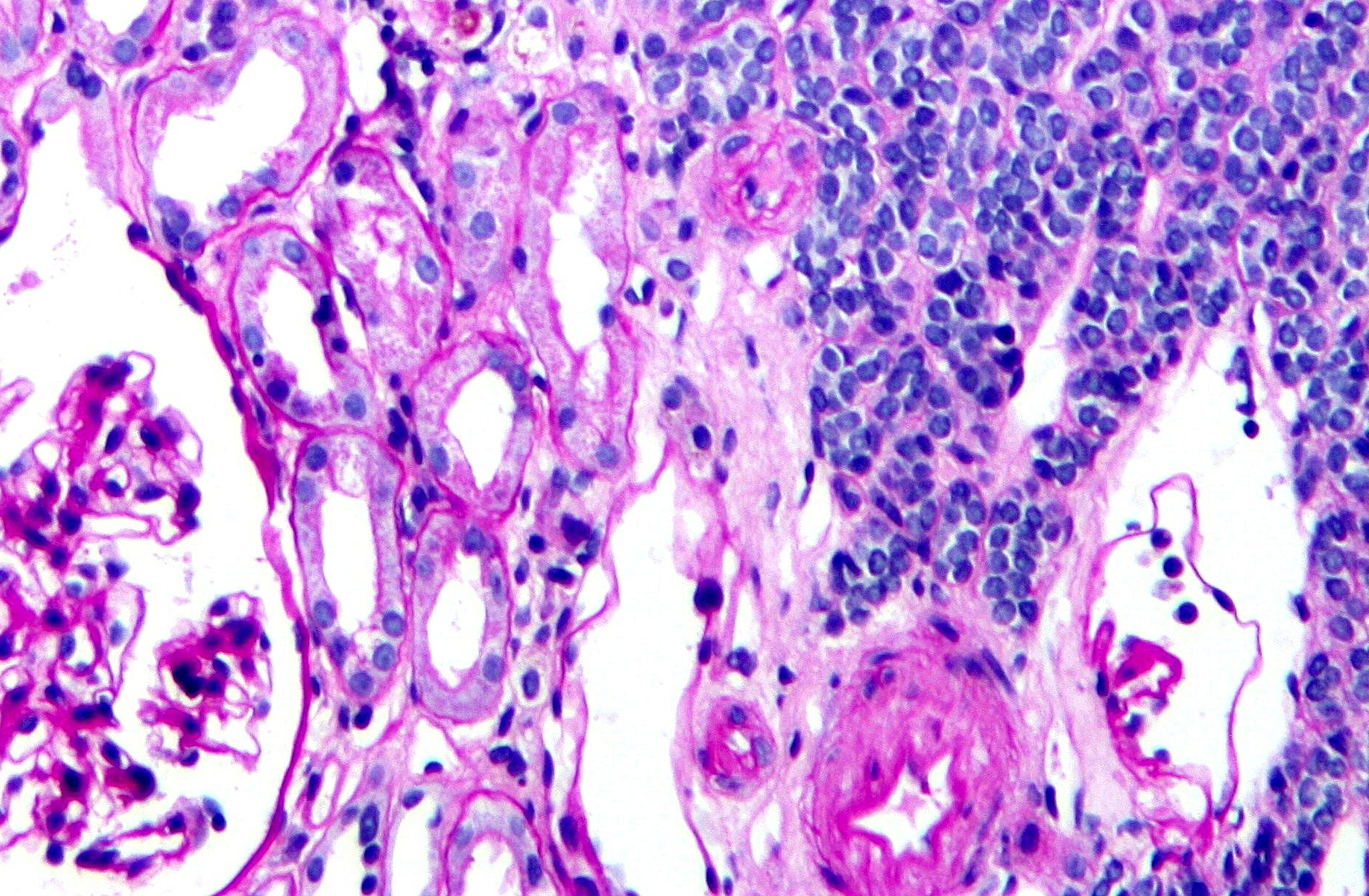
Micrograph of a metanephric adenoma, right of image, showing the characteristic features (round nuclear membrane, no nucleoli, and fine chromatin). Normal kidney is seen on the left of the image. Kidney biopsy. PAS stain.

Metanephric adenoma is diagnosed histologically. The tumours can be located at upper pole, lower pole and mid-hilar region of the kidney; they are well circumscribed but unencapsulated, tan pink, with possible cystic and hemorrhagic foci. They show a uniform architecture of closely packed acinar or tubular structures of mature and bland appearance with scanty interposed stroma. Cells are small with dark staining nuclei and inconspicuous nucleoli. Blastema is absent whereas calcospherites may be present. Glomeruloid figures are a striking finding, reminiscent of early fetal metanephric tissue. The lumen of the acini may contain otherwise epithelial infoldings or fibrillary material but it is quite often empty. Mitoses are conspicuously absent. In the series reported by Jones et al. tumour cells were reactive for Leu7 in 3 cases of 5, to vimentine in 4 of 6, to cytokeratin in 2 of 6, to epithelial membrane antigen in 1 of 6 cases and muscle specific antigen in 1 of 6. Olgac et al. found that intense and diffuse immunoreactivity for alpha-methylacyl-CoA racemase (AMACR) is useful in differentiating renal cell carcinoma from MA but a panel including AMACR, CK7 and CD57 is better in this differential diagnosis. Differential diagnosis may be quite difficult indeed as exemplified by the three malignancies initially diagnosed as MA that later metastasized, in the report by Pins et al.

=== Cytogenetic characteristics ===
Brunelli et al. stated that genetic analysis of chromosome 7, 17, and Y may facilitate discrimination of MA from papillary renal cell carcinoma in difficult cases. Their study showed that MA lacks the frequent gain of chromosomes 7 and 17 and losses of the Y chromosome that are typical of papillary renal cell neoplasms, suggesting that MA is not related to renal cell carcinoma and papillary adenoma.

== Treatment ==
As metanephric adenomas are considered benign, they can be left in place, i.e. no treatment is needed.

== History ==
MA has been described in the past under other names such as néphrome néphronogène, metanephroider Nierentumor and nephroblastomartiges Nierenadenom (5) but the term metanephric adenoma was suggested by Brisigotti, Cozzutto et al. in 1992 and then widely accepted. Prior to this report, Nagashima et al. in 1991 had not offered a nosological innovation for their two cases whereas the denomination of néphrome néphronogène proposed by Pages and Granier in 1980 had gone largely undetected.
