= Trigonitis =

- Specialty: Urology

Trigonitis is a condition of inflammation of the trigone region of the bladder. It is more common in women.

The cause of trigonitis is not known, and there is no solid treatment. Electrocautery is sometimes used, but is generally unreliable as a treatment, and typically does not have quick results. Several drugs, such as muscle relaxants including urinary antispasmodics, antibiotics, and antiseptics have varied and unreliable results. Other forms of treatment include urethrotomy, cryosurgery, and neurostimulation.
