= Penile discharge =

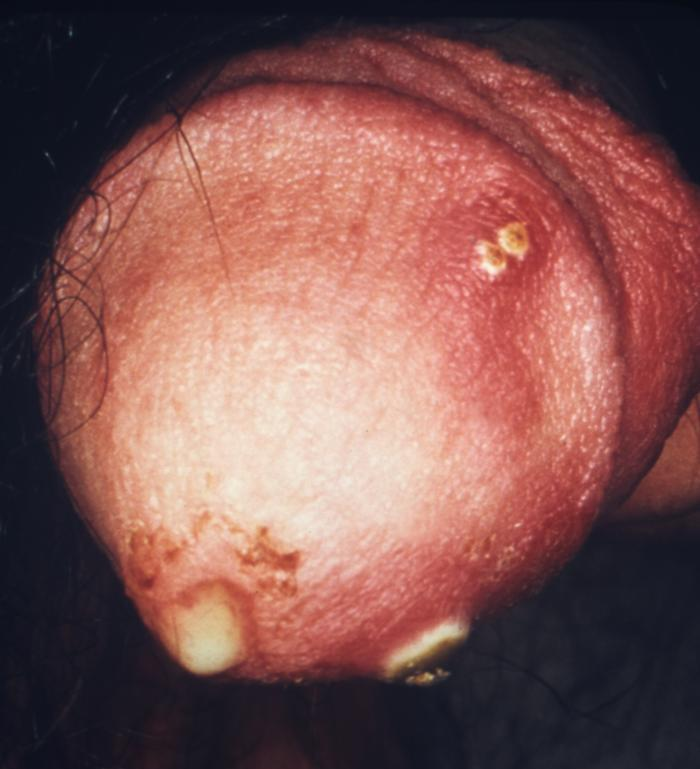
- This male presented with a purulent penile discharge due to gonorrhea with an overlying penile pyodermal lesion. Pyoderma involves the formation of a purulent skin lesion, in this case located on the glans penis, and overlying the sexually transmitted disease gonorrhea.
- Symptoms: Fluid from penis
- Causes: Infections including gonorrhea, chlamydia, trichomoniasis

Penile discharge is fluid that comes from the urethra at the end of the penis that is not urine, pre-ejaculate or semen.

Common causes include infections due to gonorrhea, chlamydia, or trichomoniasis. In gonorrhea the discharge may be white, yellow, or green.

A swab of the discharge is usually performed.

Treatment depends on the cause. Spread of infection is reduced by also treating sexual contacts.

Risk factors include being sexually active men under the age of 25, having a recent new sexual partner, or having unprotected sex.

== Definition and clinical features ==
This male presented discharge commonly found in an early stage of gonorrhea. This is one of the possible symptoms seen in up 90% of males with gonorrhea, usually within 2 to 5 days

Penile discharge is liquid from the urethra at the end of the penis that is not urine or semen. The dripping of clear fluid (pre-ejaculate) when sexually excited is normal.

There may be pain or burning when passing urine, soreness inside the penis or feeling of wanting to pass urine frequently.

== Causes ==
Common causes include infections due to gonorrhea, chlamydia, or trichomoniasis.

Other causes include:

- Non-specific urethritis
- Acute prostatitis
- Infection under the foreskin
- Warts at the opening of the urethra
- Herpes simplex virus ulcer at the opening of the urethra
- Object in the urethra or recent surgical procedure.
- A bloody discharge may be a sign of urethral cancer.

== Evaluation ==
A swab of the discharge is usually performed. Other investigations may include tests for HIV, hepatitis and syphilis.

Men who have sex with men may also need to have throat and rectal swabs.

== Treatment ==
Treatment depends on the cause and any antibiotic prescribed depends on which infection is found. Spread of infection is reduced by informing sexual partners so that they can also be treated, and not having sex (including oral or anal) until tests are completed and seven days have passed after treatment.

== Epidemiology ==
Risk factors include being sexually active men under the age of 25, having a recent new sexual partner, unprotected sex (without a condom), or having the presence of any sexually transmitted infection.
