= Mycoplasma hominis infection =

Infection with a predominantly sexual mode of transmission

- Specialty: Infectious disease

The exact role of Mycoplasma hominis (and to a lesser extent Ureaplasma) regarding some conditions related to pregnant women and their (unborn) offspring is controversial. This is mainly because many healthy adults have genitourinary colonization with Mycoplasma, published studies on pathogenicity have important design limitations, and the organisms are challenging to detect. The likelihood of colonization with M. hominis appears directly linked to the number of lifetime sexual partners Neonatal colonization does occur, but only through normal vaginal delivery. Caesarean section appears protective against colonization and is much less common. Neonatal colonization is transient.

== Signs and symptoms ==
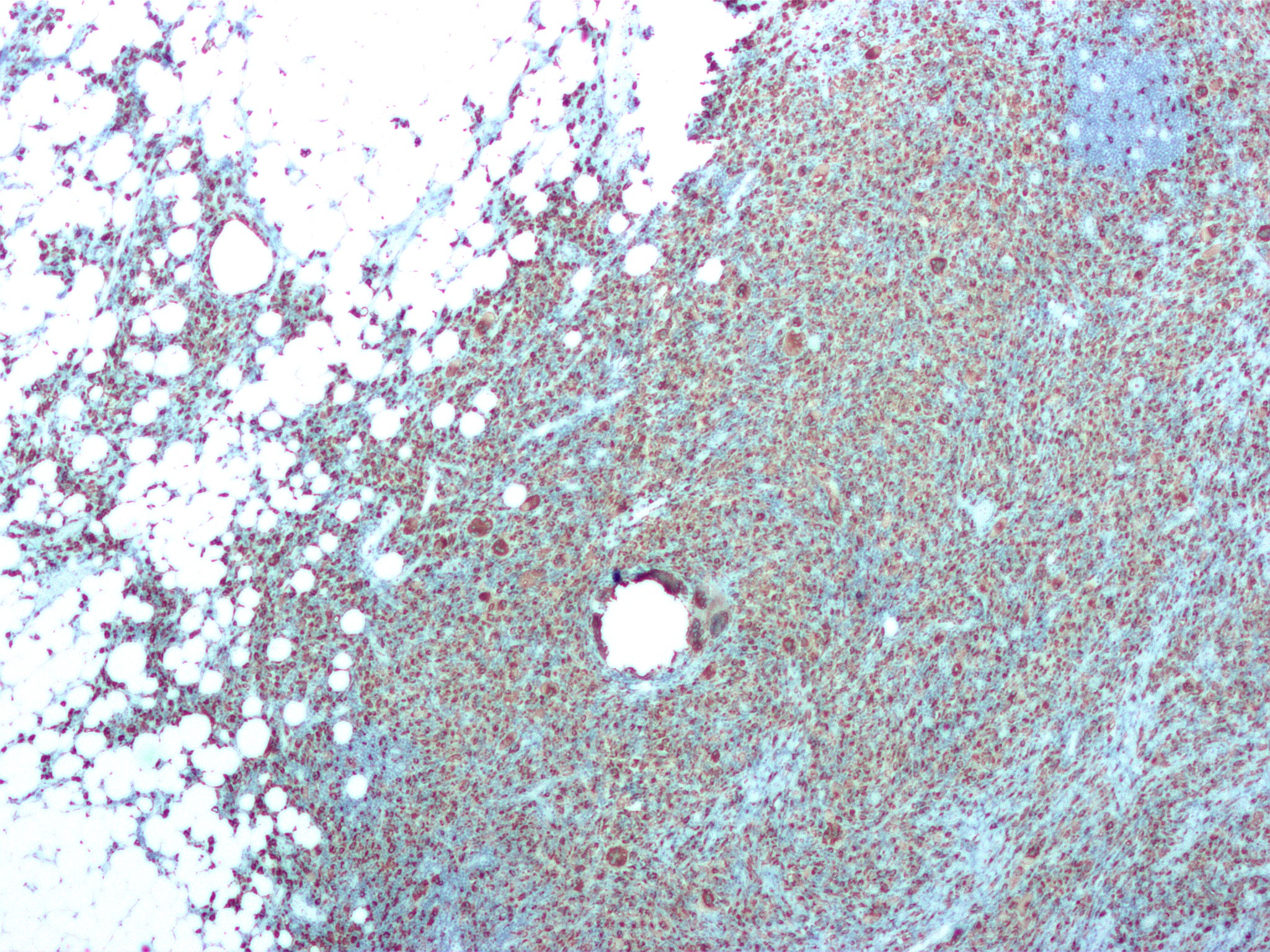
pyelonephritis

Those with urogenital or extragenital infections caused by M. hominis have symptoms similar to other sexually transmitted infections, and its presence cannot be determined by its symptoms. The precise role this organism plays in causing disease remains speculative. Diagnosis remains difficult because the organism is difficult to culture in vitro. PCR-based techniques are still rare outside research scenarios. The following conditions have been linked to Mycoplasma hominis:

- pyelonephritis
- cystitis
- Pelvic inflammatory disease (PID)
- endometritis
- chorioamnionitis
- surgical and nonsurgical wound infections
- bacteremia
- pneumonia
- meningitis
- salpingitis
- urethritis
- septic arthritis
- cervicitis

Mycoplasma hominis is often present in polymicrobial infections.

== Prevention ==
If symptomatic, testing is recommended. The risk of contracting Mycoplasma infection can be reduced by the following:

- Using barrier methods such as condoms
- Seeking medical attention if you are experiencing symptoms suggesting a sexually transmitted infection.
- Seeking medical attention after learning that a current or former sex partner has, or might have had, a sexually transmitted infection.
- Getting a STI history from your current partner and insisting they be tested and treated before intercourse.
- Avoiding vaginal activity, particularly intercourse, after the end of a pregnancy (delivery, miscarriage, or abortion) or certain gynecological procedures, to ensure that the cervix closes.
- Abstinence

== Treatment ==
Mycoplasmas have a triple-layered membrane and lack a cell wall. Therefore, mycoplasmas are not affected by penicillins and other antibiotics that interfere with the cell wall synthesis. The growth of mycoplasmas in their host is inhibited by other broad-spectrum antibiotics. These broad-spectrum antibiotics inhibit the multiplication of the mycoplasma but do not kill them. Tetracyclines, macrolides, ketolides, and quinolones are used to treat mycoplasma infections. In addition to the penicillins, mycoplasmas are resistant to rifampicin. Mycoplasmas may be difficult to eradicate from human or animal hosts or cell cultures by antibiotic treatment because of antibiotic resistance, or because it does not kill the mycoplasma cell. Mycoplasma cells can invade the cells of their hosts.

== Neonatal infection ==
Neonates, especially if preterm, are susceptible to M. hominis infection. Meningoencephalitis in neonates has been described, and M. hominis may be a significant causative agent of neonatal sepsis or meningitis. M. hominis has been associated with chorioamnionitis. M. hominis is associated with miscarriage.
