= Urethrovaginal fistula =

Medical condition

A urethrovaginal fistula is an abnormal passageway that may occur the urethra and the vagina. It is a sub-set of vaginal fistulas. It results in urinary incontinence as urine continually leaves the vagina. It can occur as an obstetrical complication, catheter insertion injury or a surgical injury.

It is also called a urethral fistula and may be referred to as UVF. They are quite rare. In the developed world, they are typically due to injuries due to medical activity.
