= Glandular metaplasia =

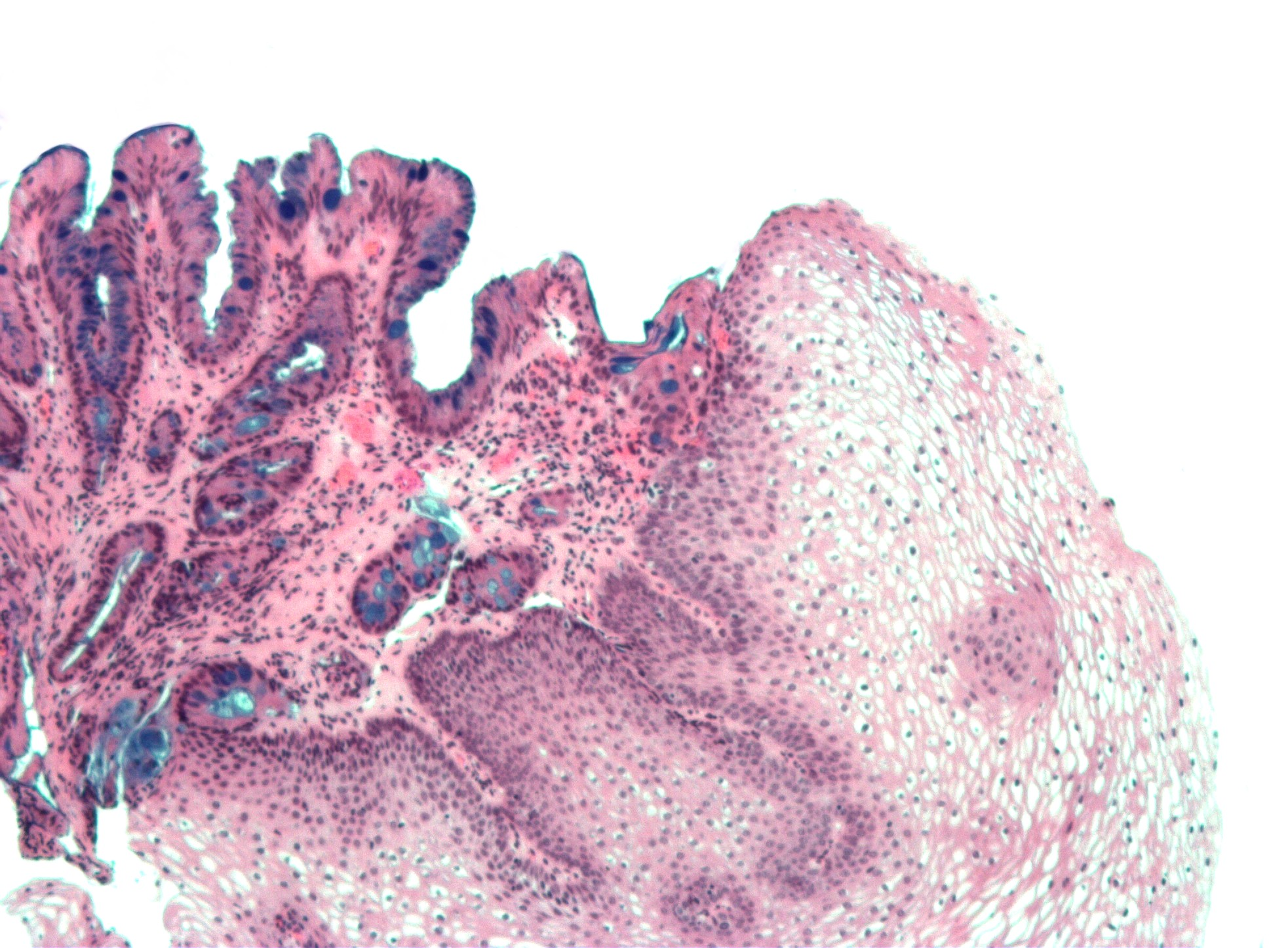
Micrograph of Barrett's esophagus (left of image) and normal stratified squamous epithelium (right of image). Alcian blue stain.

Glandular metaplasia is a type of metaplasia where irritated tissue converts to a glandular form.

An example occurs in the esophagus, where tissue becomes more similar to the tissue of the stomach.

Another example occurs in the urinary bladder.

== See also ==
- Intestinal metaplasia
- Squamous metaplasia

== Additional images ==
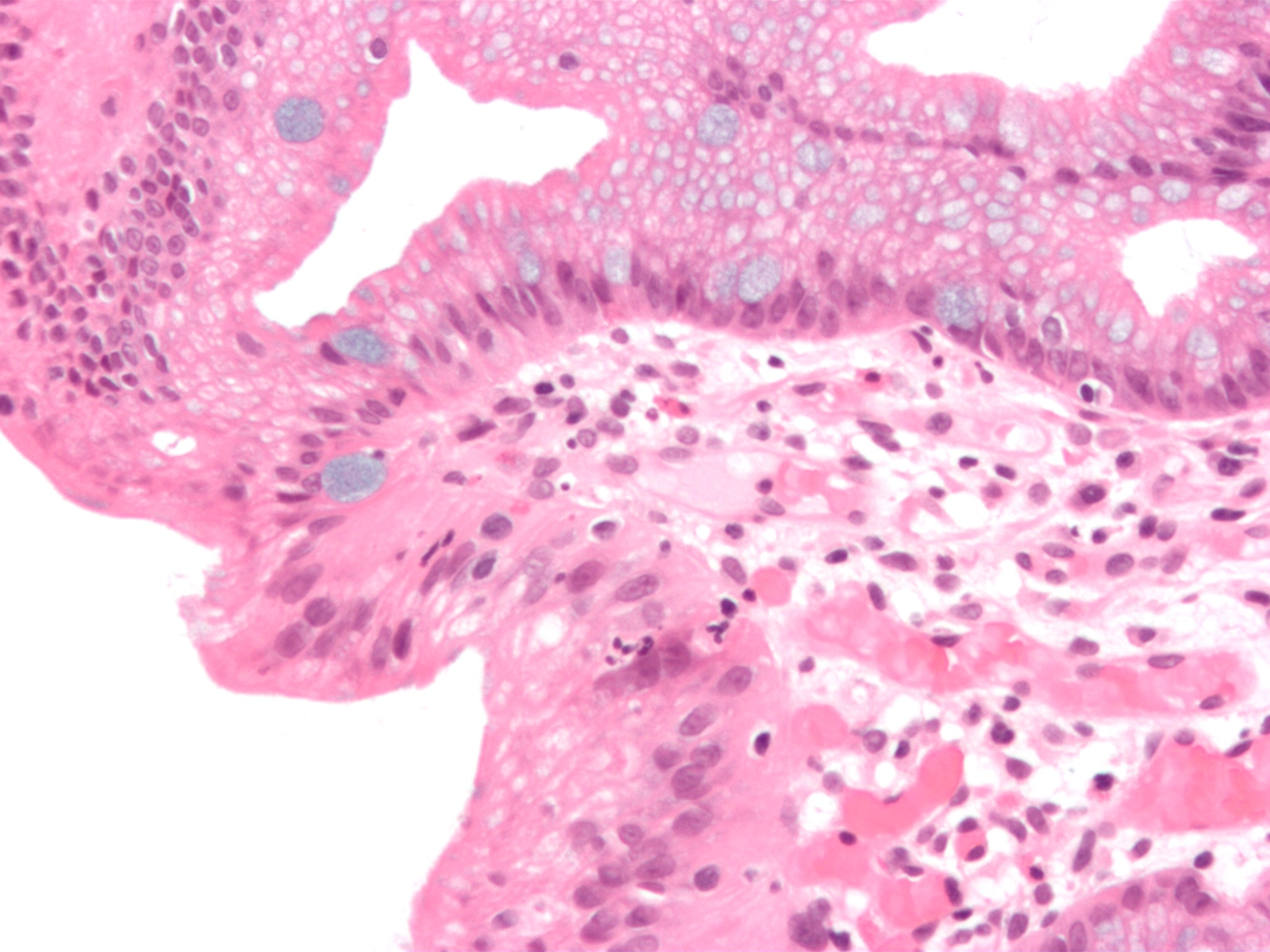
Micrograph of Barrett's esophagus, an example of glandular metaplasia.
