= Cystourethrectomy =

Surgical removal of the bladder and urethra

- Other names: Cysto-urethrectomy
- Specialty: Urology

A cystourethrectomy or cysto-urethrectomy is a surgical procedure in which the urinary bladder and urethra are removed. The procedure combines a cystectomy and a urethrectomy.

== See also ==
- List of surgeries by type
