= Anterior urethral cancer =

- Specialty: Urology/oncology

Anterior urethral cancer is a disease in which malignant cancer cells are found in the part of the urethra that is closest to the outside of the body.
