= Nephrogenic adenoma =

- Other names: Mesonephric adenoma, nephrogenic metaplasia
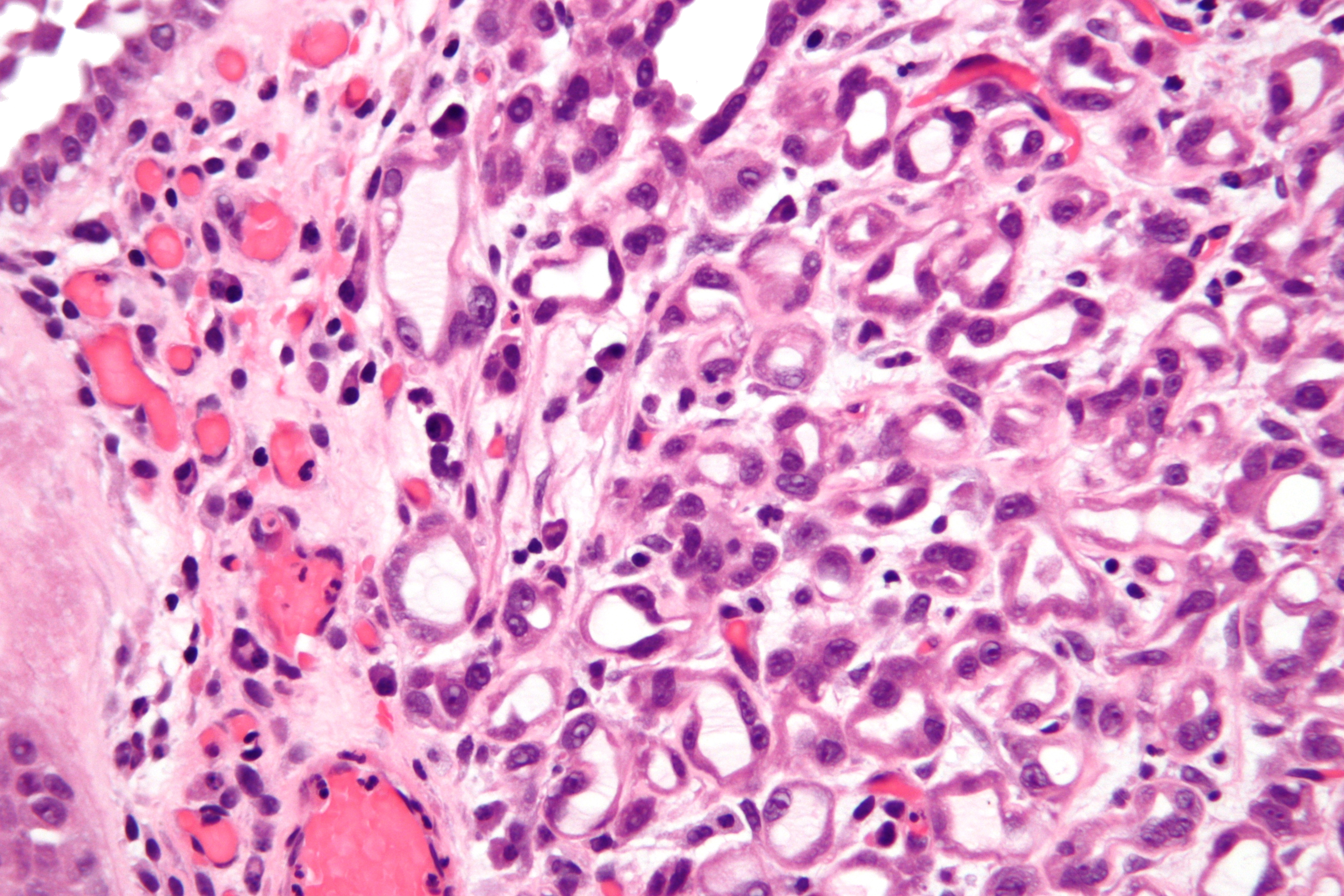
- Micrograph of a nephrogenic adenoma. H&E stain.
- Specialty: Urology, oncology

Nephrogenic adenoma is a benign growth typically found in the urinary bladder.

It is thought to result from displacement and implantation of renal tubular cells, as this entity in kidney transplant recipients has been shown to be kidney donor derived.

This entity should not be confused with the similar-sounding metanephric adenoma.

== Diagnosis ==
Nephrogenic adenomas are diagnosed under the microscope by pathologists. Microscopically the tumor shows closely packed small tubular structures in edematous stroma. The tubules show considerable variation in size and shape resembling convoluted tubules of the kidney. The single layer of cells lining the tubules are cuboidal with a scant to moderate amount of cytoplasm. In some areas they may have a hobnail appearance.

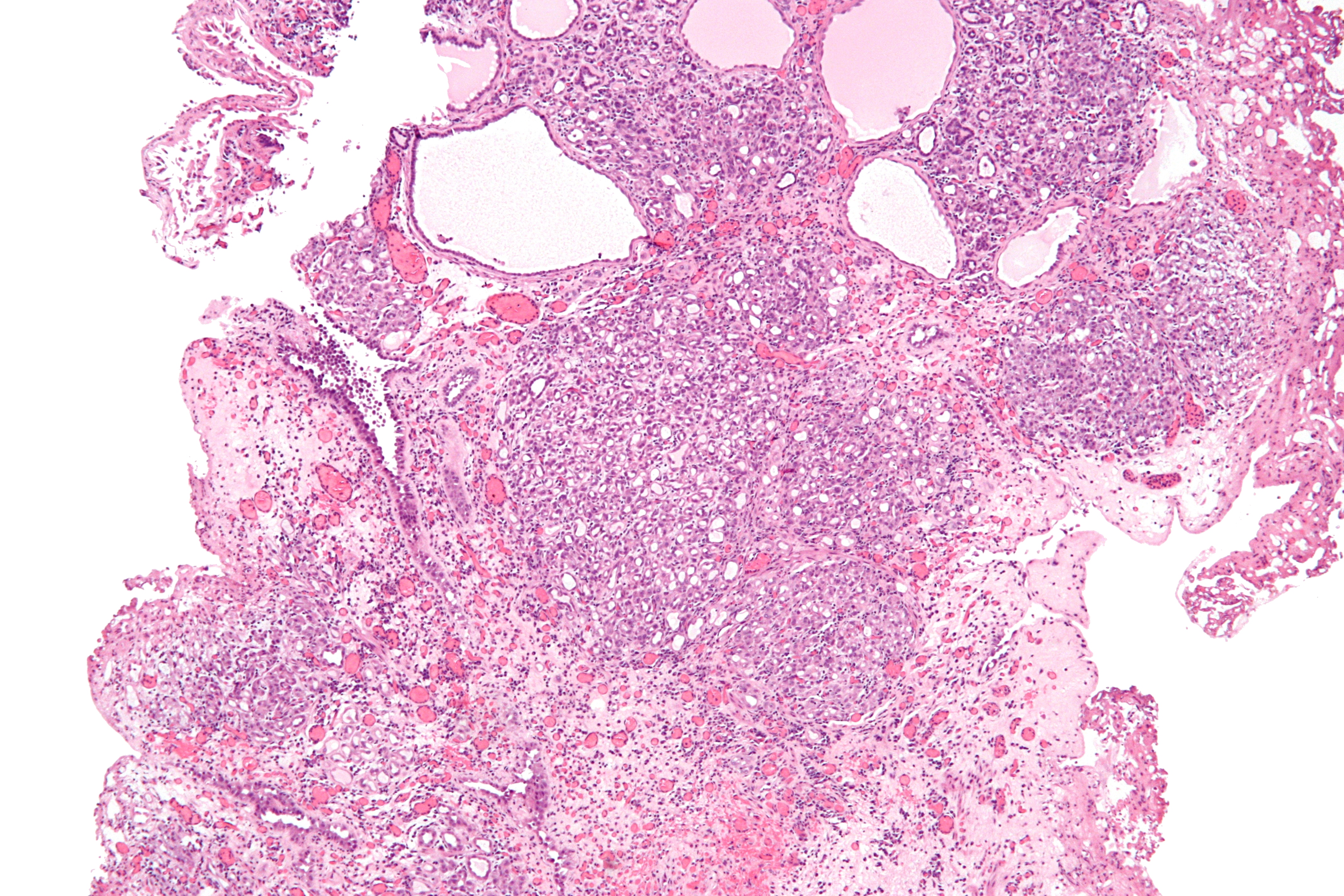
Low mag

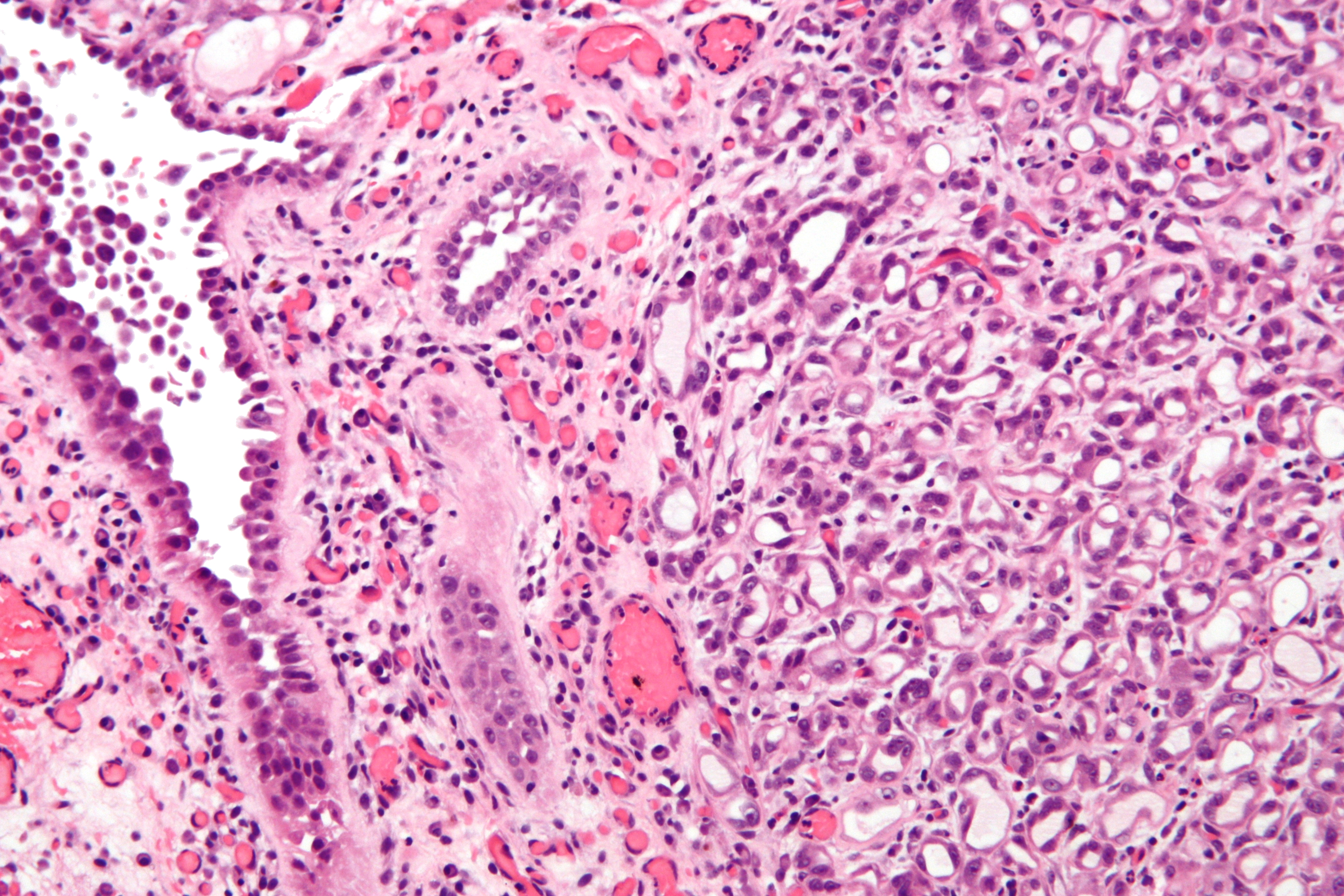
High mag

== Treatment ==
Even though there is no evidence of malignant potential, transurethral resection is recommended together with long-term antibiotic prophylaxis for at least one year after resection. Prolonged antibiotic therapy is suggested due to the frequent finding of UTI as an associated or causative factor.

== See also ==
- Metanephric adenoma
