= Trigone of urinary bladder =

Triangular region of the internal urinary bladder

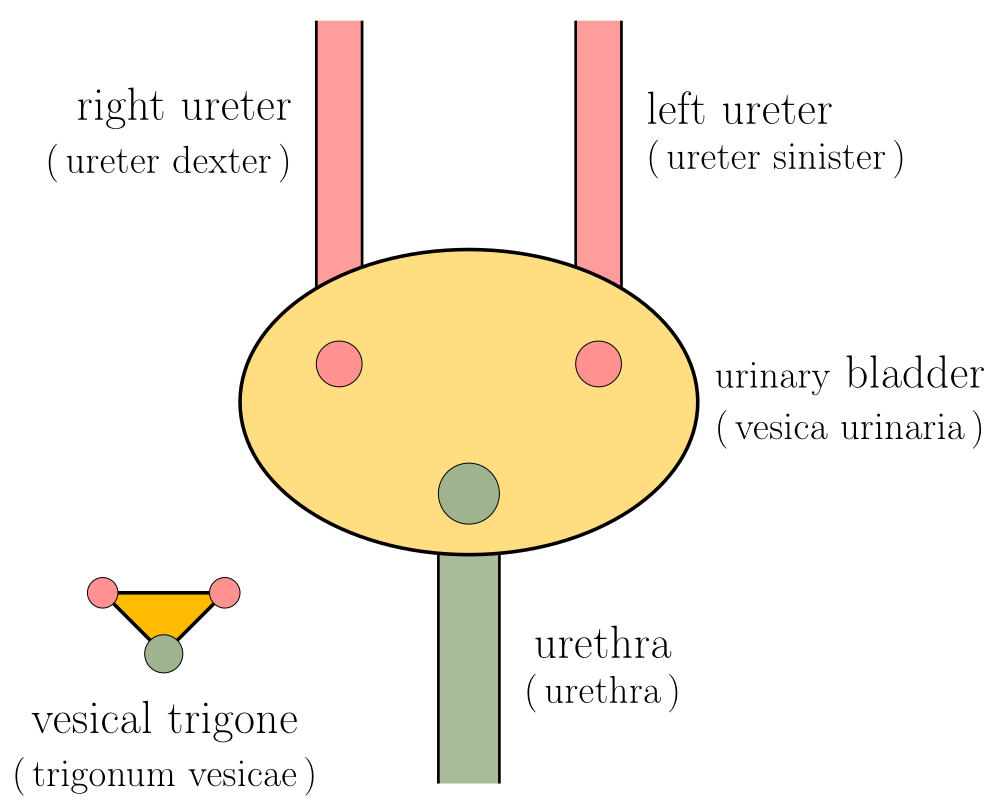
- trigone of urinary bladder

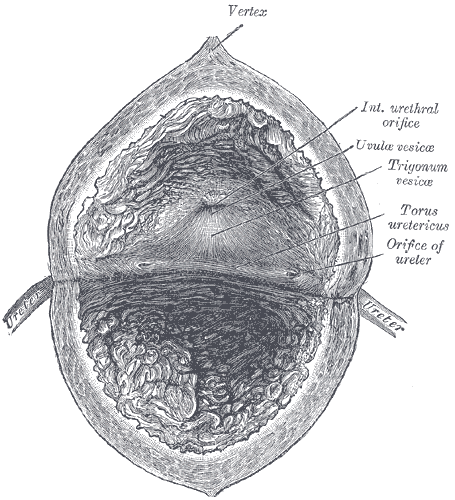
- The interior of bladder.

Details

Identifiers
- Latin: trigonum vesicae urinariae
- TA98: A08.3.01.024
- TA2: 3421
- FMA: 15910

The trigone of urinary bladder (also known as the vesical trigone) is a smooth triangular region of the urinary bladder formed by the two ureteric orifices and the internal urethral orifice. Between the ureteric openings, there is a fold of mucous membrane called the interureteric crest or Mercier bar. The trigone lies between the crest or ridge, and the neck of the bladder.

The area is very sensitive to expansion and once stretched to a certain degree, stretch receptors in the urinary bladder signal the brain of its need to empty. The signals become stronger as the bladder continues to fill.

Embryologically, the trigone of the bladder is derived from the caudal end of mesonephric ducts, which is of intermediate mesodermal origin (the rest of the bladder is endodermal). In the female the mesonephric ducts regress, causing the trigone to be less prominent, but still present.

== Clinical significance ==
The trigone can become irritated in a condition known as trigonitis resulting from long term use of a catheter, or from infection.
