= Parachlamydia acanthamoebae =

Scientific classification
- Domain: Bacteria
- Kingdom: Pseudomonadati
- Phylum: Chlamydiota
- Class: Chlamydiia
- Order: Chlamydiales
- Family: Parachlamydiaceae
- Genus: Parachlamydia
- Species: P. acanthamoebae

Binomial name
- Parachlamydia acanthamoebae Amann et al 1997

Species of bacterium

Parachlamydia acanthamoebae are bacterium that fall into the category of host-associated microorganisms. This bacterium lives within free-living amoebae that are an intricate part of their reproduction. Originally named Candidatus Parachlamydia acanthamoebae, its current scientific name was introduced shortly after. This species has shown to have over eighty percent 16S rRNA gene sequencing identity with the class Chlamydiia. Parachlamydia acanthamoebae has the same family as the genus Neochlamydia with which it shares many similarities.

== Discovery ==
The isolation of Parachlamydia acanthamoebae is credited to Rolf Michel and Bärbel Hauröder-Philippczyk in Berlin, 1994. Using a nasal swab from volunteers, they were able to isolate coccoid-shaped bacteria that were present among other naturally-produced organisms. Although at least ten subsequent attempts at reisolation were tried, P. acanthamoebae was not isolated again until 1997 when the researchers Rudolf Amann, Nina Springer, and Wolfgang Ludwig isolated it with a strain of Acanthamoeba species. This sample was transferred to a non-nutrient agar plate and the parasitized trophozoite of the Acanthamoeba species multiplied. A trophozoite is an active stage in the Acanthamoeba species life cycle in which the protozoan grows and feeds. The researchers were able to isolate the infected trophozoites by this method only once, as subsequent tries were unsuccessful. The researchers then took small aliquots of the organism and filtered it to ensure the sample was pure. After running these samples through a centrifuge, a machine with a rapid rotating inner container, the samples were used to directly amplify the 16S rRNA gene to form a nearly full-length rRNA sequence by Polymerase Chain Reaction. The ribosomal DNA was sequenced using the T7 sequencing kit of Pharmacia. After analyzing the genome and confirming 86% 16S rRNA gene sequence identity to members of the genus Chlamydia, they proposed Parachlamydia acanthamoebae be classified under the order of Chlamydiales.

== Phylogeny ==
Amann et al. used a number of methods to analyze the phylogeny of Parachlamydia acanthamoebae. They were able to amplify rRNA fragments that covered almost all of the rRNA operon using PCR. A distance matrix was used to compare the attained 16S and 23S rRNA sequences with the 16S rRNA with other bacteria in the Chlamydia family as well as other bacteria from known phyla. The ARB Project and the FastDNAml tool were used to perform maximum parsimony and maximum likelihood analyses. The maximum likelihood analysis was performed by comparing the rRNA sequence from Parachlamydia acanthamoebae to rRNA sequences from the entire ARB Project database. The maximum likelihood analysis compared the P. acanthamoebae rRNA sequences with the same bacteria used in the distance matrix. Their analyses showed that P. acanthamoebae has an 86 to 87% sequence similarity with bacteria in the Chlamydia genus. It had a sequence similarity of 70 to 75% when compared to bacteria from other phyla in the same domain. From this information, they proposed that the bacteria are likely a novel member of a genus in the family Chlamydiaceae. Everett et al. set out to determine the characteristics that specifically distinguish all the families in the order Chlamydiales, and in doing so proposed that the formation of the family Parachlamydiaceae. They used Sequencher data analysis tools to accumulate 23S rRNA gene sequences from bacteria in all of the families within Chlamydiales. Sequence information for the 16S rRNA genes of these bacteria was collected from GenBank. They used the Clustal W program to align all of the 16S and 23S data that was collected. PAUP version 4.0 was used to create maximum parsimony and neighbor-joining phylogenetic trees. They found that P. acanthamoebae has a 16S rRNA sequence that is 15% different and a 23S rRNA sequence that is 17% different from members of the family Chlamydiaceae. From this, they proposed the formation of a new family, Parachlamydiaceae, where P. acanthamoebae is currently classified under.

== Genomic information ==
Greub et al. states that although there was a previous attempt to sequence the genome of P. acanthamoebae, the absence of a bridge element that helps with the assembly of the sequence and the repair of gaps made it difficult for researchers to completely sequence its genome. Pyrosequencing using the GS20 method and Solatex technology sequenced 1.6 Mbp of raw reads that each contained 36 bp, which were assembled into 95 contigs using GS20 reads. These reads were assembled in 8616 overlapping sequences that helped to further develop the genome. Through comparative genomics with the family Chlamydiaceae and the species Protochlamydia amoebophilia, a GC content of 35-36% and an approximate genome size of 2.4-3 Mbp were concluded. Further analysis of the genome of P. acanthamoebae shows that this bacterium has genes that encode a chemotaxis system that is similar to the system found in Escherichia coli. No other bacteria in Chlamydiales have been found to encode for a system similar to the one present in P. acanthamoebae. This chemotaxis system encodes for at least 15 proteins. Collingro et al. believe this system to be functional, as they found no mutations in the gene sequences for these proteins. The specific role of this chemotaxis system in P. acanthamoebae is unclear, however, since this bacterium is non-motile.

== Physiology ==
Parachlamydia acanthamoebae is widely distributed in nature, being found in aquatic as well as terrestrial environments. Due to this organism's symbiotic relationship with Acanthamoeba, it has the ability to survive a wide array of environmental stresses. It is a coccoid bacterium with a diameter of 0.5 um that has a variable reaction to gram staining. It is a mesophilic bacteria that can be grown on Vero cells.

=== Developmental stages ===
Similar to other Chlamydiales, it is commonly found in two developmental stages, the first of which is the elementary body, which is the infective stage of the organism. The other developmental stage it is commonly found in is the reticulate body, which is its metabolically active dividing stage. However, Parachlamydia acanthamoebae and bacteria within the family Parachlamydiaceae can also be found a crescent body stage, which has been found to be a more efficient infective stage for the organism. The elementary body has been found to be the most dominant stage this organism resides in once within an amoeba. Studies found that the elementary bodies were mainly found in vacuoles, and as incubation time continued, the organism continued to replicate within the vacuole. Researchers were able to show that Parachlamydia acanthamoebae is mainly found in the reticulate body stage while it is present in the cytoplasm. This organism was only in the crescent body stage after a significant incubation time, and even then it was only found within vacuoles and not in the cytoplasm of the infected amoeba. The only stage that this organism was proven to be in outside of the amoeba was the elementary stage.

=== Life cycle ===
The Parachlamydia acanthamoebae begins its life cycle by entering the amoeba by phagocytosis in either the elementary stage or the crescent stage. During this time, it begins to acquire the endosomal and lysosomal integral glycoprotein, designated Lamp-1. Once within the amoebic cell, the organism changes its morphology to the reticulate body, where it then replicates by binary fission. Once in this stage, they can then leave the vacuole, and enter the cytoplasm. During the time that the amoeba is infected, it begins to increase significantly in size. This can be attributed to the increase in vacuoles in the cytoplasm that contain Parachlamydia acanthamoebae. Replication of the organism continues until the amoeba lyses.

== Pathogenicity ==
=== In humans ===
Parachlamydia acanthamoebae has been shown to infect and multiply in simian and human cells. Experimental models were able to demonstrate that this bacterium can enter, replicate, and lyse in human macrophages and pneumocytes. A study in 2003 examined P. acanthamoebae's ability to enter and survive in human macrophages. These researchers collected human macrophages and placed these cells on growth plates in conjunction with P. acanthamoebae. The results for this study showed that after an 8-hour time period, eighty percent of the macrophages incubated with live P. acanthamoebae were infected with an average of 3.8 bacteria and were located in vacuoles. Their results also shows that the P. acanthamoebae cells continued to replicate within the macrophages, and eventually caused apoptosis. Although research on this bacterium and how it can affect humans is minimal, there are several studies that link P. acanthamoebae to the onset of illnesses in humans. The diseases that have been connected to this bacterium primarily affect the respiratory system. Research shows that pneumonia, bronchitis, and atherosclerosis are among the most common complications that have arisen from ingestion of this bacterium by humans. Although these studies show that P. acanthamoebae is linked to human diseases, researchers have not been able to isolate this bacteria directly from a human.

=== Presence in water treatment plants ===
In a study that assessed whether different bacteria were present in a water treatment plant, P. acanthamoebae had been found in the river water that fed the water treatment plant that was used in the experiment. These researchers looked at the different steps within the water treatment facility, including sand filtration, followed by ozonation, and finally granular activated carbon filtration, also known as GAC. They found this bacterium within a biofilm around the GAC. From this finding, the researchers concluded that this bacteria was able to bypass the ozonation step of the water treatment, which means it passed through this step inside an undetected Acanthamoeba species. This shows that it can protect itself from the harsh conditions in the treatment facility, or that the bacteria itself is resistant to ozonation.

=== In cattle ===
Parachlamydia acanthamoebae has also been implicated as an abortive agent when it is present in Swiss cattle. Researchers in Switzerland randomly selected 235 late term abortions in cattle during the breeding season of 2003 and 2004 and used PCR to detect the presence of this bacterium in the sample. They found that 43 of the 235 cases tested positive for the presence of P. acanthamoebae. Further examination of these positive cases showed that 25 of the 43 cases showed necrotizing placentitis and 35 of the 43 cases were confirmed positive by the presence of the antibody that was elicited against the bacterial infection. Not only is this detrimental to the cattle infected with the bacteria, but it also poses a zoonotic risk to humans because handling this aborted material could facilitate the contraction of bronchitis or pneumonia.

=== Antibiotic resistance and susceptibilities ===
Parachlamydia acanthamoebae has shown that it is affected by the presence of antibiotics when it is inside of the host. One study analyzed two strains of P. acanthamoebae, the Hall's Coccus strain and the BN9 strain, and tested their response to a number of common antibiotics. They cultured Acanthamoeba polyphaga, a common endosymbiotic host of P. acanthamoebae, in a PYG medium and added 20 μl of P. acanthamoebae to the growth plates. A portion of the amoeba were left both drug-free and free of P. acanthamoebae as a control to measure amoebal viability in the medium. Another portion was only subjected to antibiotics. The purpose of this is to serve as a control to assess if the amoeba itself displayed any antibiotic toxicity. In this experiment, they found that Acanthamoeba polyphaga was not effected by any of the tested antibiotics. They found that most of the beta-lactam antibiotics, vancomycin, and fluoroquinolones had no effect on the growth of P. acanthamoebae. Because of this, it can be inferred that these two strains of P. acanthamoeba are resistant to these antibiotics. However, both of these strains showed inhibited growth when in the presence of macrolides, doxycycline, aminoglycosides, and rifampin. These results show that P. acanthamoebae shows susceptibility and resistance to antibiotics that is very different from other closely related microbes, such as Chlamydia trachomatis or Chlamydophila pneumoniae.
