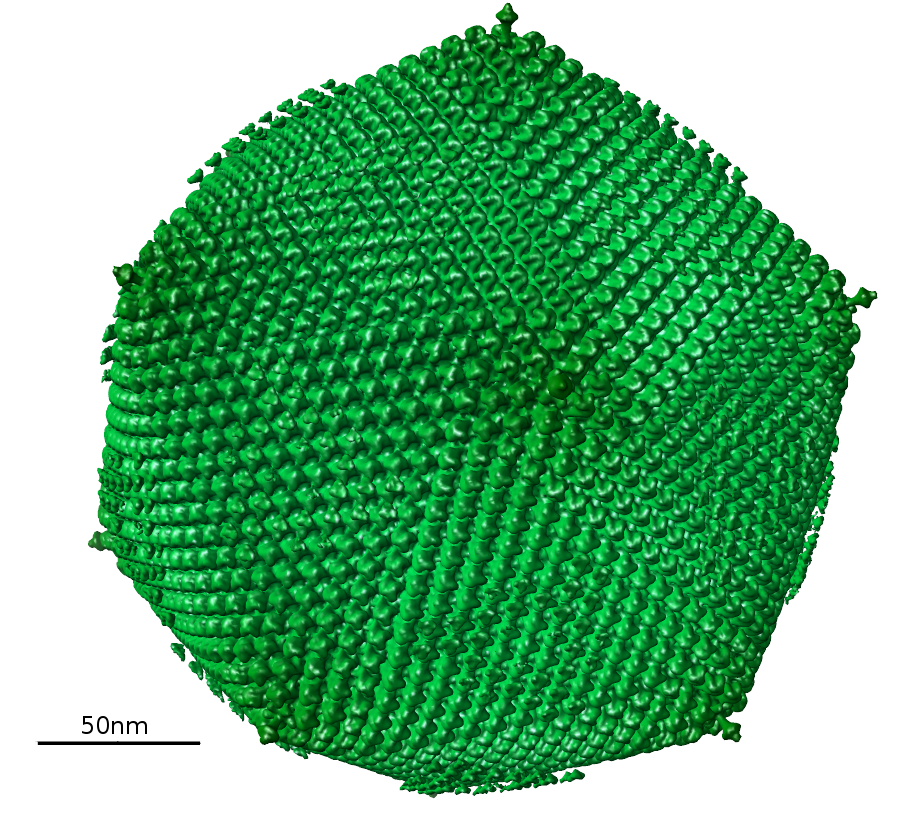
- Cryo electron microscopy reconstruction of Faustovirus, from EMD-8144

Virus classification
- Group: Group I (dsDNA)
- Family: Asfarviridae
- Genus: Faustovirus

= Faustovirus =

Genus of viruses

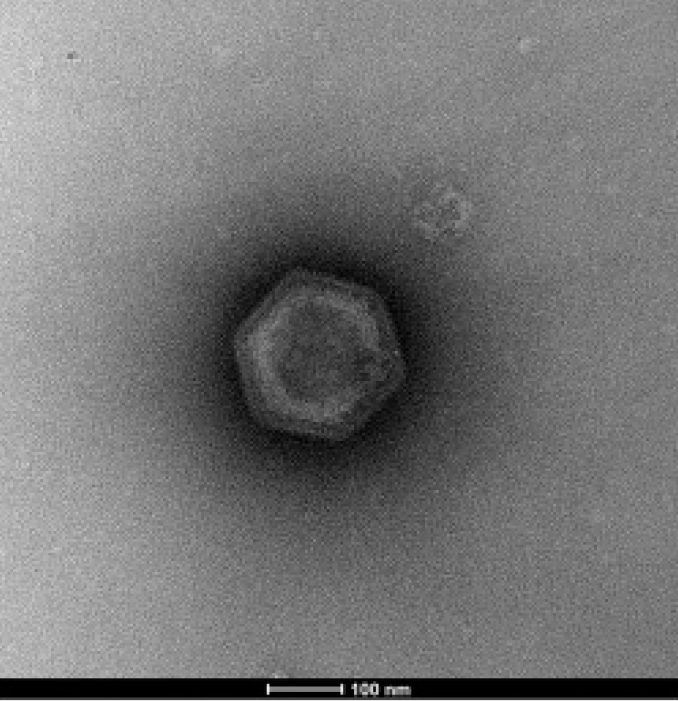
Negative staining of "Faustovirus ST1" purified suspension showing an icosahedral particle of 200 nm. Scale bar 100 nm.

Faustovirus is a genus of giant virus which infects amoebae associated with humans. The virus was first isolated in 2015 and shown to be around 0.2 micrometers in diameter with a double stranded DNA genome of 466 kilobases predicted to encode 451 proteins. Although classified as a nucleocytoplasmic large DNA virus (NCLDV), faustoviruses share less than a quarter of their genes with other NCLDVs; however, ~46% are homologous to bacterial genes and the remainder are orphan genes (ORFans). Specifically, the gene encoding the major capsid protein (MCP) of faustovirus is different than that of its most closely related giant virus, asfivirus, as well as other NCLDVs. In asfivirus, the gene encoding MCP is a single genomic fragment of ~2000 base pairs (bp), however, in faustovirus the MCP is encoded by 13 exons separated by 12 large introns. The exons have a mean length of 149 bp and the introns have a mean length of 1,273 bp. The presence of introns in faustovirus genes is highly unusual for viruses.

== Replication ==
The replication strategy of faustovirus in amoeba is similar to that of mimivirus. Lasting 18 to 20 hours, the replication cycle begins with the amoeba ingesting individual viral particles through a process known as phagocytosis. After about 2 to 4 hours post infection, virus particles are internalized via phagocytic vacuoles and are detected by the host. While the particles appear near the host's nucleus, there is no evidence that the virus is within the nucleus or has an interaction with the nuclear membrane. Similar to the mimivirus, in which a channel is created for particle proteins and DNA to travel through, the faustovirus particles empty their internal compartments into the amoeba's cytoplasm. In both viruses, the fusion leads to an eclipse phase in which the contents of particles become invisible inside the cytoplasm of the host. However, the eclipse phase of the faustovirus is longer than the mimivirus, taking place from 4 to 6 hours post infection. Characterized by a loss of its spherical shape and a decrease in surface area, the amoeba host cell undergoes reorganization, such that at 8 to 10 hours post infection there are new particles in a region forming a donut shape. This region is the viral factory; it is distinct from the nucleus and is surrounded by mitochondria. Between 12- and 18-hours post infection, the virus factory takes up the entirety of the cytoplasm, which is completely filled with new viral particles. At 18- to 20-hours post infection, the viral particles are released through cell lysis.

== Pathogenicity ==
Faustovirus affects amoeba associated with the human environment, like Vermamoeba vermiformis; this particular amoeba has been found in hospital water networks, drinking water, human stool samples, and contact lenses of keratitis patients, thus it may be a possible carrying agent for viruses. Faustoviruses have been found in sewage water from various geographical locations, such as Senegal, France, Lebanon, and Saudi Arabia. Isolated strains of the virus have been detected in rodents, cattle, febrile and healthy humans, and well water and rivers. Although faustovirus was found in humans, it is unknown whether it has a pathogenic effect on humans; more research is required to determine the mode of infection and consequences of infection, if any exist.
