= Neochlamydia =

Scientific classification
- Domain: Bacteria
- Kingdom: Pseudomonadati
- Phylum: Chlamydiota
- Class: Chlamydiia
- Order: Chlamydiales
- Family: Parachlamydiaceae
- Genus: Neochlamydia; Horn et al. 2001
- Species: N. hartmannellae

Binomial name
- Neochlamydia hartmannellae Horn et al. 2001

Genus of bacteria

Neochlamydia hartmannellae is a species of bacteria, the type and only species of the genus Neochlamydia. It is a bacterial endocytobiont of Hartmannella vermiformis, hence its name.
