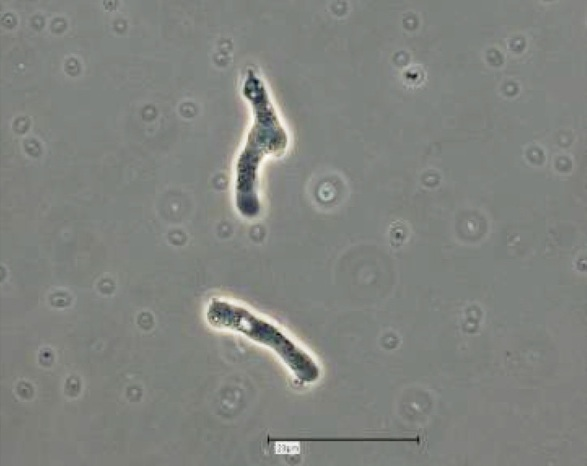
- V. vermiformis in its trophozoidal form

Scientific classification
- Domain: Eukaryota
- Supergroup: Amorphea
- Phylum: Amoebozoa
- Class: Tubulinea
- Order: Echinamoebida; Cavalier-Smith, 2004 em. Smirnov et al., 2011
- Family: Vermamoebidae; Cavalier-Smith & Smirnov, 2011
- Genus: Vermamoeba; Cavalier-Smith & Smirnov, 2011
- Species: V. vermiformis

Binomial name
- Vermamoeba vermiformis (Page, 1967) Smirnov & Cavalier-Smith, 2011

Synonyms
- Hartmannella vermiformis Page, 1967

= Vermamoeba vermiformis =

Species of protist

Vermamoeba vermiformis is a widespread free-living amoeba from the genus Vermamoeba. It was first described in 1967 and placed in the genus Hartmannella, but phylogenetic research led to its reclassification into its current genus in 2011. It has two forms: a motile trophozoidal form to feed and divide, and a dormant cyst form to survive harsher environments. It appears to rarely infect humans, and it serves as host to a wide range of microorganisms, including pathogenic bacteria, fungi, and viruses.

== Taxonomy and classification ==
Vermamoeba vermiformis was first described by Frederick C. Page in 1967 alongside five other amoeba species. It was initially placed in the genus Hartmannella. Later phylogenetic analysis showed that it was not closely related to other members of Hartmanella, leading a team led by Alexey Smirnov to reclassify the amoeba in a new genus Vermamoeba in 2011. Vermamoeba is a sister group to Echinamoeba.

== Description ==
Vermamoeba vermiformis has a two-stage life cycle: a motile trophozoite stage where it divides and feeds; and a dormant cyst stage to survive stressors such as nutrient depletion, osmotic stress, and temperature or pH changes. No flagellate form has been described.

The trophozoites are worm-shaped or slug-like. Locomotive forms are 22–42 μm long and typically monopodial, sometimes becoming more irregular with multiple pseudopoda. Some host uroidal filaments. They have visible granulae and a small anterior hyaline zone. In the trophozoidal form, V. vermiformis is able to move at a rate of 34–92 μm per minute. Cysts are small and spherical, about 6 μm in size. Cyst walls have two components: a 50 nm thick endocyst and a 110–140 nm thick ectocyst that hosts proteins and a small amount of glucose polymers. Unlike Acanthamoeba cysts, no cellulose or ostioles are observed. Cysts have one or two nuclei. Encystment takes about 9 hours. Rates of encystment increase with cell concentration but differ in regards to osmotic and pH stress between strains.

== Habitat and ecology ==
Vermamoeba vermiformis is very widespread, having been found in springs, contact lens cases, hospital water systems, soaked cloths, and bottled mineral water. Freshwatever environments, surface water, soil, and biofilms are its primary natural habitats.

It is a heterotrophic and predatory free-living amoeba. It contributes to the balance of its host biosphere by grazing on microorganisms and organic particles. To feed, V. vermiformis uses phagocytosis while adhering to surfaces.

== Pathogenicity ==
V. vermiformis being infected by fadolivirus

Vermamoeba vermiformis was declared a parasite of humans in 1997. Infections are rare, though it has been found to cause ulcers and keratitis. In keratitis cases, it can co-infect with Acanthamoeba. Its pathogenicity is debated; some microbiologists assert that due to its ubiquitousness, it may simply be a contaminant in some reported cases. However, its ability to cause cell damage in vitro through cytopathic products has been demonstrated.

V. vermiformis can also host pathogenic microorganisms, such as the bacteria Stenotrophomonas maltophilia, several Chlamydia species, and Legionella pneumophila; viruses like enteroviruses and the giant viruses Yasminevirus, Faustovirus, Orpheovirus, and Tupanvirus; and fungi like yeasts from Candida and Exophiala.
