= 2025 Catalonia swine fever outbreak =

Outbreak of African swine fever in Catalonia, Spain

Coordinates: 41°30′05″N 2°05′28″E

In November and December 2025, a major outbreak of African swine fever occurred in wild boars in Catalonia, Spain. Thirteen boars have been killed by the virus, and several countries halted imports of Catalonian pork in response.

== Background ==
Spain is the largest pork producer in the European Union and the second-largest pork exporter in the world, exporting 8.8 billion euros of pork products in 2024. Catalonia accounts for around 8% of Spain's pork production.

African swine fever is caused by African swine fever virus. ASF is harmless to humans, but is extremely infectious in pigs and often fatal. The disease can survive for upwards of several months in processed meat. ASF has no vaccine or cure. The last time that an infection of ASF was reported in Spain was in 1994.

== Outbreak ==
On 28 November 2025, an outbreak of African swine fever (ASF) was reported in the municipality of Bellaterra in Catalonia. Two dead boars had been found that tested positive for the virus. On 2 December, a further seven boars tested positive for ASF. By 7 December, a total of 13 wild boars had been killed by the virus.

No new cases have been reported as of 8 December, leaving the total infected at 13.

== Origin ==
The origin was originally believed to be cold meat, perhaps dropped by someone driving through the area, but this was ruled out after investigation. However, on 7 December, Spanish authorities began investigating the possibility that it may have started as a lab leak from any of five local research centres. In particular, the nearby Centre for Research in Animal Health, IRTA-CReSA, was investigated. CReSA was found on 12 December to have been researching ASF at the time of the outbreak.

The strain of virus does not match any strains found nearby in Europe; instead, it was similar to a strain found in Georgia in 2007.

On 13 November, a report was published by the Spanish Ministry of Agriculture that pointed to Russia as a possible source for the virus. The virus entered Russia from Georgia in 2007 and has since spread north across the country.

== Responses ==
Most government efforts centred around the effort to avoid the spread of the virus to Catalonia's pork farms. 117 members of the Spanish military emergency unit were deployed to the area to study and help contain the outbreak, along with over 1,000 members of the Catalan police force. Spain's agriculture minister, Luis Planas, met on 2 December with represented with the national pork industry. The national government approved a €10 million aid package to lessen the economic impact of the disease. The regional president of Catalonia ordered an audit into several meat farms and laboratories in the area, and a committee was formed. The Catalan Minister of Agriculture, Òscar Ordeig, defended plans to reduce the population of boars in the region, saying "There are too many".

On 9 December, the Catalan government declared a state of emergency in response to the outbreak. A high-risk area comprising 12 municipalities was declared in which certain outdoor activities are restricted, including hunting, camping, activities with dogs, and some access to natural areas. A larger low-risk area was also created with less restrictions. Collserola Natural Park was completely closed.

China halted imports of pork from Barcelona province in response to the outbreak. The United Kingdom halted imports from the entire Catalonia region. South Korea paused imports from within 20 kilometres of the location of the outbreak, but kept importing pork from elsewhere in Spain. Japan, the Philippines, Malaysia, Taiwan, Mexico, and Thailand paused all Spanish pork imports. Due to Spain's regionalisation efforts, imports from the rest of Spain went largely unaffected.

Several companies, including the Jorge Group, laid off many workers in response to the pressures of the crisis.

== See also ==
- African swine fever virus#History
