= Protochlamydia naegleriiphila =

Scientific classification (Candidatus)
- Domain: Bacteria
- Kingdom: Pseudomonadati
- Phylum: Chlamydiota
- Class: Chlamydiia
- Order: Chlamydiales
- Family: Parachlamydiaceae
- Genus: "Ca. Protochlamydia"
- Species: "Ca. P. naegleriiphila"

Binomial name
- "Candidatus Protochlamydia naegleriiphila" corrig. Casson et al. 2008

Synonyms
- "Candidatus Protochlamydia naegleriophila" Casson et al. 2008 (inaccurate spelling)

Intracellular parasite of amoeba

Protochlamydia naegleriiphila is an intracellular parasite of amoeba. This Protochlamydia species can be an etiological factor of pneumonia in humans when present in the Naegleria amoeba, which lives in human lungs.

== Morphology ==
Protochlamydia naegleriiphila is a gram negative cocci, and is generally about 1 μm in diameter. The organism exists in three distinct morphological phases: elementary bodies, crescent bodies and reticulate bodies, which are associated with the phases of infection in amoeba. Elementary bodies generally have a smoother appearance and are smaller, whereas reticulate bodies are larger and have a rougher cell shape.

== Metabolism ==
The metabolism of this organism depends on its morphological phase. Elementary and crescent bodies are the spore-like state of the organism, and are metabolically inert. Reticulate bodies are the active, dividing phase of the organism, and are metabolically active. When the organism is within an amoeba and is dividing, it is thought to use mainly the host ATP directly for energy, rather than through gaining ATP indirectly from the host through catabolism of host molecules. However, studies from the closely related Chlamydia trachomatis show that the organism is still capable of glycolysis.

== Genome ==
The strain "KNic" of P. naegleriiphila, discussed in the article "Protochlamydia naegleriophila as Etiologic Agent of Pneumonia from the journal emerging infectious diseases", has a genome size of 2.8 Mbp, a GC content of 43%, and about 2445 genes. The GenBank accession number for this strain is LN879502.

== Infection cycle ==
The first step of the infection cycle is when an elementary body enters the amoeba. P. naegleriiphila will then transform into the metabolically active reticulate body, and begins to divide within the cell. Once there is a high enough density of Protochlamydia cells, the being to revert to elementary or crescent bodies. Then these elementary bodies will be released from the cell and begin a new cycle of infection.
