= Dinodnavirus =

Virus classification
- (unranked): Virus
- Genus: Dinodnavirus
- Species: Dinodnavirus heterocapsae

Synonyms
- Heterocapsa circularisquama DNA virus 01; HcDNAV Virus name abbr.; HcDNAV01 Virus name abbr.; AB522601 GenBank accession; NC_038702 REFSEQ accession

Genus of viruses

Dinodnavirus is a genus of viruses that infect dinoflagellates. This genus belongs to the clade of nucleocytoplasmic large DNA viruses. The only species in the genus is Heterocapsa circularisquama DNA virus 01 (Dinodnavirus heterocapsae).

== Name ==
The order name, Dinodnavirales, is a combination of Dino, from host dinoflagellate and dna, from its DNA genome.

== Virology ==
The virus has an icosahedral capsid 180–210 nanometers in diameter.

The genome is a single molecule of double stranded DNA of about 356-kilobases.

It infects the dinoflagellate Heterocapsa circularisquama.

During replication virions emerge from a specific cytoplasm compartment – the 'viroplasm' – which is created by the virus.

== Taxonomy ==
DNA studies have shown that the genus belongs in the family Asfarviridae.
