= Parachlamydia =

Scientific classification
- Domain: Bacteria
- Kingdom: Pseudomonadati
- Phylum: Chlamydiota
- Class: Chlamydiia
- Order: Chlamydiales
- Family: Parachlamydiaceae
- Genus: Parachlamydia; Everett, Bush & Andersen 1999

Type species
- Parachlamydia acanthamoebae Everett, Bush & Andersen 1999

Species
- P. acanthamoebae

Synonyms
- "Ca. Parachlamydia" Amann et al. 1997; "Ca. Parachlamydia acanthamoebae" Amann et al. 1997

Genus of bacteria

Parachlamydia is a genus of bacteria belonging to the Chlamydiota. Species include P. acanthamoebae.
