= Parachlamydiaceae =

Scientific classification
- Domain: Bacteria
- Kingdom: Pseudomonadati
- Phylum: Chlamydiota
- Class: Chlamydiia
- Order: Chlamydiales
- Family: Parachlamydiaceae; Everett et al., 1999

Genera
- "Ca. Mesochlamydia"; "Ca. Metachlamydia"; Neochlamydia; Parachlamydia; "Ca. Protochlamydia"; "Ca. Rubidus"

Family of bacteria

Parachlamydiaceae is a family of bacteria in the order Chlamydiales. Species in this family have a Chlamydia–like cycle of replication and their ribosomal RNA genes are 80–90% identical to ribosomal genes in the Chlamydiaceae. The Parachlamydiaceae naturally infect amoebae and can be grown in cultured Vero cells. The Parachlamydiaceae are not recognized by monoclonal antibodies that detect Chlamydiaceae lipopolysaccharide.

== Phylogeny ==
The currently accepted taxonomy is based on the List of Prokaryotic names with Standing in Nomenclature (LPSN) and National Center for Biotechnology Information (NCBI).

16S rRNA based LTP_10_2024

- Parachlamydiaceae
  - Neochlamydia hartmannellae
  - Parachlamydia acanthamoebae

120 marker proteins based GTDB 10-RS226

- Parachlamydiaceae
  - - Parachlamydia acanthamoebae Everett, Bush & Andersen 1999
    - - Neochlamydia hartmannellae Horn et al. 2001
      - "Ca. Rubidus massiliensis" Pagnier et al. 2015
  - - "Ca. Protochlamydia"
      - "Ca. P. phocaeensis" Bou Khalil et al. 2017
      - - "Ca. P. amoebophila" Collingro et al. 2005
        - "Ca. P. naegleriophila" Casson et al. 2006

Unassigned species:

- "Ca. Mesochlamydia elodeae" Corsaro et al. 2012
- "Ca. Metachlamydia lacustris" Corsaro et al. 2010

Isolated Endosymbionts include:

- Hall's coccus
- P9
- UV-7
- endosymbiont of Acanthamoeba sp. TUME1
- endosymbiont of Acanthamoeba sp. UWC22
- endosymbiont of Acanthamoeba sp. UWE1

Uncultured lineages include:

- Neochlamydia turtle type 1
- environmental Neochlamydia
- corvenA4
- cvC15
- cvC7
- cvE5

Parachlamydia acanthamoebae has variable Gram staining characteristics and is mesophilic. Trophozoites of Acanthamoeba hosting these strains were isolated from asymptomatic women in Germany and also in an outbreak of humidifier fever (‘Hall’s coccus’) in Vermont USA. Four patients from Nova Scotia whose sera recognized Hall's coccus did not show serological cross-reaction with antigens from the Chlamydiaceae.

== See also ==
- List of bacterial orders
- List of bacteria genera

== Notes ==
Metachlamydia lacustris and Protochlamydia species were found at the National Center for Biotechnology Information (NCBI) but have no standing with the Bacteriological Code (1990 and subsequent Revision) as detailed by List of Prokaryotic names with Standing in Nomenclature (LPSN) as a result of the following reasons:
• No pure culture isolated or available for prokaryotes.
• Not validly published because the effective publication only documents deposit of the type strain in a single recognized culture collection.
• Not approved and published by the International Journal of Systematic Bacteriology or the International Journal of Systematic and Evolutionary Microbiology (IJSB/IJSEM).
