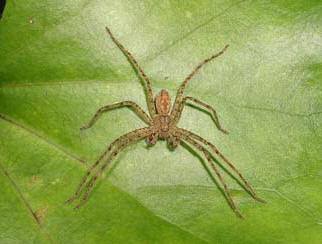
- Male P. spirembolus in Okinawa, Japan

Scientific classification
- Kingdom: Animalia
- Phylum: Arthropoda
- Subphylum: Chelicerata
- Class: Arachnida
- Order: Araneae
- Infraorder: Araneomorphae
- Family: Sparassidae
- Genus: Pseudopoda
- Species: P. spirembolus

Binomial name
- Pseudopoda spirembolus Jäger & Ono, 2002

= Pseudopoda spirembolus =

Species of spider

Pseudopoda spirembolus is a species of huntsman spider found in Japan.

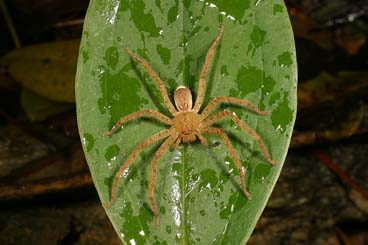
Female P. spirembolus in Okinawa, Japan

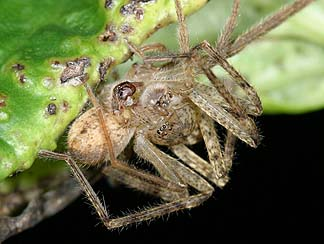
Mating P. spirembolus in Okinawa, Japan
