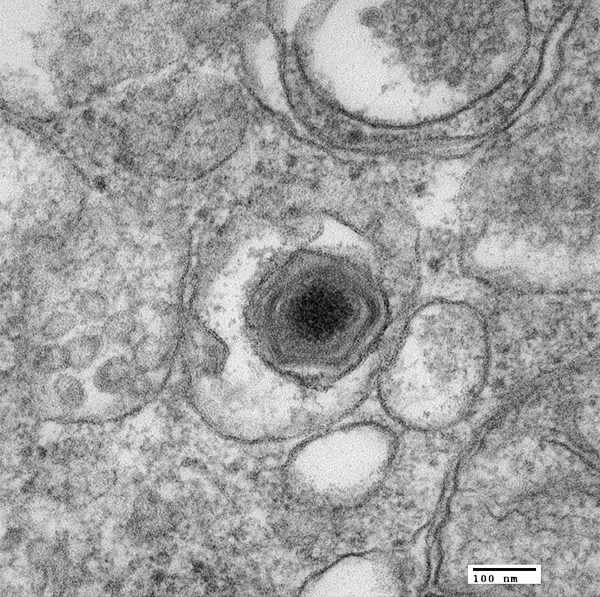
- African swine fever virus particle

Virus classification
- (unranked): Virus
- Realm: Varidnaviria
- Kingdom: Bamfordvirae
- Phylum: Nucleocytoviricota
- Class: Pokkesviricetes
- Order: Asfuvirales
- Family: Asfarviridae

Genera
- See text

= Asfarviridae =

Family of viruses

Asfarviridae is a family of viruses, the best-studied of which is African swine fever virus, which are double-stranded DNA viruses. A 2025 genomic-analysis study comparing many of the so-called “extended Asfarviridae” viruses (e.g. Faustovirus, Kaumoebavirus, Pacmanvirus, Abalone asfa‑like virus (AbALV) along with African swine fever virus) found that these lineages are so genetically divergent that they likely represent multiple distinct viral families rather than a single “extended Asfarviridae” group. This suggests that the diversity of giant dsDNA viruses related to ASFV is far greater than previously recognised, and that taxonomic re-classification may be required.

== Taxonomy ==
There is only one species under Asfarviridae in ICTV 2022:

- Genus Asfivirus
  - Species African swine fever virus

But, there may be more viruses:

- Abalone asfarvirus
- Dinodnavirus (Heterocapsa circularisquama DNA virus or hcDNAV)
- Faustovirus
- Kaumoebavirus
- Pacmanvirus
- Additional genomes known from environmental sampling of diverse marine, freshwater, and terrestrial habitats
