= Hartmannella =

Scientific classification
- Domain: Eukaryota
- Phylum: Amoebozoa
- Class: Tubulinea
- Order: Euamoebida
- Family: Hartmannellidae
- Genus: Hartmannella; Alexeiff, 1912

Type species
- Hartmannella hyalina (Dangeard, 1900) Aléxéieff 1912

Synonyms
- Hartmannia Aléxéieff 1912 non Newton 1891

Genus of protozoans

Hartmannella is a genus of Amoebozoa.

== Species ==
- Hartmannella agricola Goodey 1916
- Hartmannella aquara Jollos 1917
- Hartmannella biparia Richards 1968
- ?Hartmannella castellanii
- ?Hartmannella crumpae Singh & Hanumaiah 1979
- ?Hartmannella diploidea
- Hartmannella exudans Page 1967
- Hartmannella fecalis Walker 1908
- Hartmannella fluvialis Dobell 1914
- ?Hartmannella horticola (Nägler 1909)
- Hartmannella hyalina (Dangeard 1900) Aléxéieff 1912
- ?Hartmannella indicans
- Hartmannella klitzkei Arndt 1924
- Hartmannella lamellipodia Glaeser 1912
- Hartmannella leptochema Singh 1951
- ?Hartmannella limax
- Hartmannella lobifera Smirnov 1997
- ?Hartmannella motonucleata Lepşi 1960
- ?Hartmannella quadriparia Richards 1968
- ?Hartmannella tahitiensis Cheng 1970
- ?Hartmannella testudinis Ivanic 1926
- Hartmannella vacuolata Anderson, Rogerson & Hannah 1997

Hartmannella vermiformis is, however, not closely related to the other members of the genus and has been renamed as Vermamoeba vermiformis.
