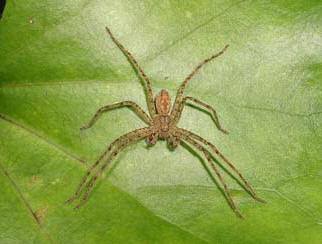
- Male Pseudopoda spirembolus in Okinawa, Japan

Scientific classification
- Kingdom: Animalia
- Phylum: Arthropoda
- Subphylum: Chelicerata
- Class: Arachnida
- Order: Araneae
- Infraorder: Araneomorphae
- Family: Sparassidae
- Genus: Pseudopoda; Jäger, 2000

Type species
- P. prompta (O. Pickard-Cambridge, 1885)

Species
- 247, see text

= Pseudopoda =

Genus of spiders

Pseudopoda is a genus of Asian huntsman spiders that was first described by Peter Jäger in 2000.

== Species ==
As of February 2023 it contains 247 species, found in Asia:

- Pseudopoda abnormis Jäger, 2001 – India
- Pseudopoda acris Zhang, Jäger & Liu, 2023 – Myanmar
- Pseudopoda acuminata Zhang, Zhang & Zhang, 2013 – China
- Pseudopoda acutiformis Zhang, Jäger & Liu, 2023 – China
- Pseudopoda akashi (Sethi & Tikader, 1988) – India
- Pseudopoda albolineata Jäger, 2001 – Nepal
- Pseudopoda albonotata Jäger, 2001 – Bhutan
- Pseudopoda aliena Zhang, Jäger & Liu, 2023 – China
- Pseudopoda allantoides Zhang, Jäger & Liu, 2023 – China
- Pseudopoda alta Jäger, 2001 – Nepal
- Pseudopoda amelia Jäger & Vedel, 2007 – China
- Pseudopoda amphitropa Zhang, Jäger & Liu, 2023 – China
- Pseudopoda anfracta Zhang, Jäger & Liu, 2023 – Vietnam
- Pseudopoda anguilliformis Zhang, Jäger & Liu, 2017 – China
- Pseudopoda apiculiformis Zhang, Jäger & Liu, 2023 – China
- Pseudopoda applanata Zhang, Jäger & Liu, 2023 – China
- Pseudopoda arta Zhang, Jäger & Liu, 2023 – Vietnam
- Pseudopoda ashcharya Jäger & Kulkarni, 2016 – India
- Pseudopoda auricularis Zhang, Jäger & Liu, 2023 – China
- Pseudopoda ausobskyi Jäger, 2001 – Nepal
- Pseudopoda bachmaensis Zhang, Jäger & Liu, 2023 – Vietnam
- Pseudopoda bacilliformis Zhang, Jäger & Liu, 2023 – China
- Pseudopoda bangaga Jäger, 2015 – Myanmar
- Pseudopoda baoshanensis Zhang, Jäger & Liu, 2023 – China
- Pseudopoda bazhongensis Zhang, Jäger & Liu, 2023 – China
- Pseudopoda beibeiensis Zhang, Jäger & Liu, 2023 – China
- Pseudopoda biapicata Jäger, 2001 – Myanmar
- Pseudopoda bibulba (Xu & Yin, 2000) – China
- Pseudopoda bicruris Quan, Zhong & Liu, 2014 – China
- Pseudopoda bifaria Zhang, Jäger & Liu, 2023 – India
- Pseudopoda birmanica Jäger, 2001 – Myanmar
- Pseudopoda brauni Jäger, 2001 – Nepal
- Pseudopoda breviducta Zhang, Zhang & Zhang, 2013 – China
- Pseudopoda byssina Zhang, Jäger & Liu, 2023 – Thailand
- Pseudopoda cangschana Jäger & Vedel, 2007 – China
- Pseudopoda caoi Zhang, Jäger & Liu, 2023 – China
- Pseudopoda casaria (Simon, 1897) – India
- Pseudopoda caudata Zhang, Jäger & Liu, 2023 – Laos
- Pseudopoda chauki Jäger, 2001 – Nepal
- Pseudopoda chayuensis Zhao & Li, 2018 – China
- Pseudopoda cheppe Caleb, 2018 – India
- Pseudopoda chiangmaiensis Zhang, Jäger & Liu, 2023 – Thailand
- Pseudopoda chishuiensis Zhang, Jäger & Liu, 2023 – China
- Pseudopoda chulingensis Jäger, 2001 – Nepal
- Pseudopoda chuxiongensis Zhang, Jäger & Liu, 2023 – China
- Pseudopoda coenobium Jäger, Li & Krehenwinkel, 2015 – China
- Pseudopoda colossa Zhang, Jäger & Liu, 2023 – China
- Pseudopoda colubrina Zhao & Li, 2018 – Myanmar
- Pseudopoda columnacea Zhang, Jäger & Liu, 2023 – Thailand
- Pseudopoda complanata Zhang, Jäger & Liu, 2023 – Thailand
- Pseudopoda conaensis Zhao & Li, 2018 – China
- Pseudopoda confusa Jäger, Pathoumthong & Vedel, 2006 – China, Laos
- Pseudopoda conica Zhang, Jäger & Liu, 2023 – China
- Pseudopoda contentio Jäger & Vedel, 2007 – China
- Pseudopoda contraria Jäger & Vedel, 2007 – China
- Pseudopoda cuneata Jäger, 2001 – Nepal
- Pseudopoda curva Zhang, Jäger & Liu, 2023 – China
- Pseudopoda daguanensis Zhang, Jäger & Liu, 2023 – China
- Pseudopoda daiyunensis Zhang, Jäger & Liu, 2023 – China
- Pseudopoda daliensis Jäger & Vedel, 2007 – China
- Pseudopoda dama Jäger, 2001 – Nepal
- Pseudopoda damana Jäger, 2001 – Nepal
- Pseudopoda dao Jäger, 2001 – Thailand
- Pseudopoda datangensis Zhang, Jäger & Liu, 2023 – China
- Pseudopoda daweiensis Zhang, Jäger & Liu, 2023 – China
- Pseudopoda daxing Zhao & Li, 2018 – Myanmar
- Pseudopoda dengi Zhang, Jäger & Liu, 2023 – China
- Pseudopoda dhulensis Jäger, 2001 – Nepal
- Pseudopoda digitaliformis Zhang, Jäger & Liu, 2023 – China
- Pseudopoda digitata Jäger & Vedel, 2007 – China
- Pseudopoda diversipunctata Jäger, 2001 – Nepal
- Pseudopoda drepanoides Zhang, Jäger & Liu, 2023 – China
- Pseudopoda emei Zhang, Zhang & Zhang, 2013 – China
- Pseudopoda everesta Jäger, 2001 – Nepal
- Pseudopoda exigua (Fox, 1938) – China, Thailand
- Pseudopoda exiguoides (Song & Zhu, 1999) – China
- Pseudopoda explanata Zhang, Jäger & Liu, 2023 – China
- Pseudopoda fabularis Jäger, 2008 – India
- Pseudopoda falcata Zhang, Jäger & Liu, 2023 – China
- Pseudopoda fissa Jäger & Vedel, 2005 – Vietnam
- Pseudopoda flabelliformis Zhang, Jäger & Liu, 2023 – India
- Pseudopoda flexa Zhang, Jäger & Liu, 2023 – China
- Pseudopoda foliiculiaris Zhang, Jäger & Liu, 2023 – China
- Pseudopoda gemina Jäger, Pathoumthong & Vedel, 2006 – Laos
- Pseudopoda gexiao Zhao & Li, 2018 – Myanmar
- Pseudopoda gibberosa Zhang, Zhang & Zhang, 2013 – China
- Pseudopoda gogona Jäger, 2001 – Bhutan
- Pseudopoda gongschana Jäger & Vedel, 2007 – China
- Pseudopoda gracilenta Zhang, Jäger & Liu, 2023 – China
- Pseudopoda grahami (Fox, 1936) – China
- Pseudopoda grandis Zhang, Jäger & Liu, 2023 – China
- Pseudopoda grasshoffi Jäger, 2001 – Nepal
- Pseudopoda heteropodoides Jäger, 2001 – Nepal
- Pseudopoda hingstoni Jäger, 2001 – India
- Pseudopoda hirsuta Jäger, 2001 – Thailand
- Pseudopoda huangensis Zhang, Jäger & Liu, 2023 – China
- Pseudopoda huanglianensis Zhang, Jäger & Liu, 2023 – China
- Pseudopoda huberi Jäger, 2015 – Myanmar
- Pseudopoda huberti Jäger, 2001 – Nepal
- Pseudopoda hupingensis Zhang, Jäger & Liu, 2023 – China
- Pseudopoda hyatti Jäger, 2001 – Nepal
- Pseudopoda imparilis Zhang, Jäger & Liu, 2023 – China
- Pseudopoda intermedia Jäger, 2001 – Myanmar
- Pseudopoda interposita Jäger & Vedel, 2007 – China
- Pseudopoda jiangi Zhang, Jäger & Liu, 2023 – China
- Pseudopoda jirensis Jäger, 2001 – Nepal
- Pseudopoda jiugongensis Zhang, Jäger & Liu, 2023 – China
- Pseudopoda kalinchoka Jäger, 2001 – Nepal
- Pseudopoda kasariana Jäger & Ono, 2002 – Japan
- Pseudopoda kavanaughi Zhang, Jäger & Liu, 2023 – China
- Pseudopoda kenmun Tanikawa, 2022 – Japan (Ryukyu Is.)
- Pseudopoda khimtensis Jäger, 2001 – Nepal
- Pseudopoda kongdangensis Zhang, Jäger & Liu, 2023 – China
- Pseudopoda kullmanni Jäger, 2001 – Myanmar, Indonesia (Sumatra)
- Pseudopoda kunmingensis Sun & Zhang, 2012 – China
- Pseudopoda lacrimosa Zhang, Zhang & Zhang, 2013 – China
- Pseudopoda langyaensis Zhang, Jäger & Liu, 2023 – China
- Pseudopoda latembola Jäger, 2001 – Nepal
- Pseudopoda liui Zhang, Jäger & Liu, 2023 – China
- Pseudopoda longa Zhang, Jäger & Liu, 2023 – China
- Pseudopoda longcanggouensis Zhang, Jäger & Liu, 2023 – China
- Pseudopoda longiuscula Zhang, Jäger & Liu, 2023 – China
- Pseudopoda longtanensis Zhang, Jäger & Liu, 2023 – China
- Pseudopoda longxiensis Zhang, Jäger & Liu, 2023 – China
- Pseudopoda luechunensis Zhang, Jäger & Liu, 2023 – China
- Pseudopoda lushanensis (Wang, 1990) – China
- Pseudopoda lutea (Thorell, 1895) – Myanmar
- Pseudopoda maeklongensis Zhao & Li, 2018 – Thailand
- Pseudopoda mamillaris Zhang, Jäger & Liu, 2023 – China
- Pseudopoda mamilliformis Zhang, Jäger & Liu, 2023 – Laos
- Pseudopoda marmorea Jäger, 2001 – Nepal
- Pseudopoda marsupia (Wang, 1991) – China, Thailand
- Pseudopoda martensi Jäger, 2001 – Nepal
- Pseudopoda martinae Jäger, 2001 – Nepal
- Pseudopoda martinschuberti Jäger, 2015 – Myanmar
- Pseudopoda mediana Quan, Zhong & Liu, 2014 – China
- Pseudopoda medogensis Zhao & Li, 2018 – China
- Pseudopoda megalopora Jäger, 2001 – Myanmar
- Pseudopoda mengsongensis Zhang, Jäger & Liu, 2023 – Laos
- Pseudopoda mingshengi Yang & Zhang, 2022 – China
- Pseudopoda minor Jäger, 2001 – India
- Pseudopoda mojiangensis Zhang, Jäger & Liu, 2023 – China
- Pseudopoda monticola Jäger, 2001 – Nepal
- Pseudopoda namkhan Jäger, Pathoumthong & Vedel, 2006 – China, Vietnam, Laos
- Pseudopoda nandaensis Zhang, Jäger & Liu, 2023 – India
- Pseudopoda nankunensis Zhang, Jäger & Liu, 2023 – China
- Pseudopoda nanlingensis Zhang, Jäger & Liu, 2023 – China
- Pseudopoda nanyueensis Tang & Yin, 2000 – China
- Pseudopoda nayongensis Zhang, Jäger & Liu, 2023 – China
- Pseudopoda nematodes Zhang, Jäger & Liu, 2023 – China
- Pseudopoda nujiangensis Zhang, Jäger & Liu, 2023 – China
- Pseudopoda nyingchiensis Zhao & Li, 2018 – China
- Pseudopoda obtusa Jäger & Vedel, 2007 – China
- Pseudopoda ohne Logunov & Jäger, 2015 – Vietnam
- Pseudopoda olivea Zhang, Jäger & Liu, 2023 – China
- Pseudopoda oliviformis Zhang, Jäger & Liu, 2023 – China
- Pseudopoda pantianensis Zhang, Jäger & Liu, 2023 – China
- Pseudopoda papilionacea Zhang, Jäger & Liu, 2023 – China
- Pseudopoda parvipunctata Jäger, 2001 – China, Thailand
- Pseudopoda peronata Zhang, Jäger & Liu, 2017 – China
- Pseudopoda perplexa Jäger, 2008 – India
- Pseudopoda physematosa Zhang, Jäger & Liu, 2019 – China
- Pseudopoda pingu Jäger, 2015 – Myanmar
- Pseudopoda platembola Jäger, 2001 – Myanmar
- Pseudopoda prompta (O. Pickard-Cambridge, 1885) (type) – Pakistan, India
- Pseudopoda putaoensis Zhao & Li, 2018 – Myanmar
- Pseudopoda qingxiensis Zhang, Jäger & Liu, 2023 – China
- Pseudopoda recta Jäger & Ono, 2001 – Taiwan
- Pseudopoda rhopalocera Yang, Chen, Chen & Zhang, 2009 – China, Myanmar
- Pseudopoda rivicola Jäger & Vedel, 2007 – China
- Pseudopoda robusta Zhang, Zhang & Zhang, 2013 – China
- Pseudopoda roganda Jäger & Vedel, 2007 – China
- Pseudopoda rufosulphurea Jäger, 2001 – Thailand
- Pseudopoda sacciformis Zhang, Jäger & Liu, 2023 – Laos
- Pseudopoda saetosa Jäger & Vedel, 2007 – China
- Pseudopoda sangzhiensis Zhang, Jäger & Liu, 2023 – Laos
- Pseudopoda schawalleri Jäger, 2001 – Nepal
- Pseudopoda schwendingeri Jäger, 2001 – Thailand
- Pseudopoda semiannulata Zhang, Zhang & Zhang, 2013 – China
- Pseudopoda semilunata Zhang, Zhang & Zhang, 2019 – China
- Pseudopoda serrata Jäger & Ono, 2001 – Taiwan
- Pseudopoda shacunensis Zhao & Li, 2018 – China
- Pseudopoda shillongensis (Sethi & Tikader, 1988) – India
- Pseudopoda shimenensis Zhang, Jäger & Liu, 2023 – China
- Pseudopoda shuo Zhao & Li, 2018 – China
- Pseudopoda shuqiangi Jäger & Vedel, 2007 – China
- Pseudopoda sicca Jäger, 2008 – India
- Pseudopoda sicyoidea Zhang, Jäger & Liu, 2017 – China
- Pseudopoda signata Jäger, 2001 – China
- Pseudopoda sinapophysis Jäger & Vedel, 2007 – China
- Pseudopoda sinopodoides Jäger, 2001 – Nepal
- Pseudopoda songi Jäger, 2008 – China
- Pseudopoda spatiosa Zhang, Jäger & Liu, 2023 – Vietnam
- Pseudopoda spiculata (Wang, 1990) – China
- Pseudopoda spiralis Zhang, Jäger & Liu, 2023 – China
- Pseudopoda spirembolus Jäger & Ono, 2002 – Japan (Ryukyu Is.)
- Pseudopoda straminiosa (Kundu, Biswas & Raychaudhuri, 1999) – India
- Pseudopoda strombuliformis Zhang, Jäger & Liu, 2023 – China
- Pseudopoda stylaris Zhang, Jäger & Liu, 2023 – Thailand
- Pseudopoda subbirmanica Zhao & Li, 2018 – Myanmar
- Pseudopoda subtilis Zhang, Jäger & Liu, 2023 – China
- Pseudopoda taibaischana Jäger, 2001 – China
- Pseudopoda taipingensis Zhang, Jäger & Liu, 2023 – China
- Pseudopoda taoi Zhang, Jäger & Liu, 2023 – China
- Pseudopoda taoyuanensis Zhang, Jäger & Liu, 2023 – China
- Pseudopoda tatsumii Tanikawa, 2022 – Japan (Ryukyu Is.)
- Pseudopoda thorelli Jäger, 2001 – Myanmar
- Pseudopoda tianpingensis Zhang, Jäger & Liu, 2023 – China
- Pseudopoda tiantangensis Quan, Zhong & Liu, 2014 – China
- Pseudopoda tinjura Jäger, 2001 – Nepal
- Pseudopoda titan Zhao & Li, 2018 – Myanmar
- Pseudopoda tji Jäger, 2015 – Myanmar
- Pseudopoda tokunoshimana Tanikawa, 2022 – Japan (Ryukyu Is.)
- Pseudopoda triangula Zhang, Zhang & Zhang, 2013 – China
- Pseudopoda triapicata Jäger, 2001 – Nepal
- Pseudopoda tricuspidata Zhang, Zhang & Zhang, 2023 – China
- Pseudopoda trigonia Zhang, Jäger & Liu, 2023 – Bhutan
- Pseudopoda trinacriformis Zhang, Jäger & Liu, 2023 – China
- Pseudopoda trisuliensis Jäger, 2001 – Nepal
- Pseudopoda uncata Yang & Zhang, 2022 – China
- Pseudopoda varia Jäger, 2001 – Nepal
- Pseudopoda virgata (Fox, 1936) – China
- Pseudopoda wamwo Jäger, 2015 – Myanmar
- Pseudopoda wang Jäger & Praxaysombath, 2009 – Laos
- Pseudopoda waoensis Zhang, Jäger & Liu, 2023 – Thailand
- Pseudopoda wenchuanensis Zhang, Jäger & Liu, 2023 – China
- Pseudopoda wu Jäger, Li & Krehenwinkel, 2015 – China
- Pseudopoda wui Zhang, Jäger & Liu, 2023 – China
- Pseudopoda wulaoensis Zhang, Jäger & Liu, 2023 – China
- Pseudopoda xia Zhao & Li, 2018 – Myanmar
- Pseudopoda yangensis Zhang, Jäger & Liu, 2023 – China
- Pseudopoda yangmingensis Zhang, Jäger & Liu, 2023 – Taiwan
- Pseudopoda yangtaiensis Zhang, Jäger & Liu, 2023 – China
- Pseudopoda yilanensis Zhang, Jäger & Liu, 2023 – Taiwan
- Pseudopoda yinae Jäger & Vedel, 2007 – China
- Pseudopoda yingjingensis Zhang, Jäger & Liu, 2023 – China
- Pseudopoda yuanjiangensis Zhao & Li, 2018 – China
- Pseudopoda yunfengensis Zhang, Jäger & Liu, 2023 – China
- Pseudopoda yunnanensis (Yang & Hu, 2001) – China
- Pseudopoda zhangi Fu & Zhu, 2008 – China
- Pseudopoda zhangmuensis (Hu & Li, 1987) – China
- Pseudopoda zhaoae Zhang, Jäger & Liu, 2023 – China
- Pseudopoda zhejiangensis (Zhang & Kim, 1996) – China
- Pseudopoda zhengi Zhang, Jäger & Liu, 2023 – Vietnam
- Pseudopoda zhenkangensis Yang, Chen, Chen & Zhang, 2009 – China
- Pseudopoda zixiensis Zhao & Li, 2018 – China
- Pseudopoda zuoi Zhang, Jäger & Liu, 2023 – China
