= ARB Project =

Free software package for phylogenetic analysis of rRNA

The ARB Project is a free software package for the phylogenetic analysis of rRNA and other biological sequences including DNA and protein sequence. It provides tools for import and assembly of genetic sequences from diverse organisms via an automated aligner module. The method was published in 2004.

The package offers two main editors—Primary Structure Editor and Secondary Structure Editor—for developing a phylogenetic tree. Visualization features allow users to compare biological sequences and phylogeny data from various organisms.

== Introduction ==
From the authors' description,

The ARB (ARB short for the Latin arbor) program package comprises a variety of directly interacting software tools for sequence database maintenance and analysis controlled by a common graphical user interface. Although it was initially designed for ribosomal RNA data, it can be used for nucleic acid and amino acid sequence data. A central database contains processed (aligned) primary structure data. Additional descriptive data can be stored in database fields assigned to the individual sequences or linked via local or worldwide networks. A phylogenetic tree visualized in the main window can be used for data access and visualization. The package contains additional tools for data import and export, sequence alignment, primary and secondary structure editing, profile and filter calculation, phylogenetic analyses, specific hybridization probe design and evaluation, and other components for data analysis.

The latest version of the software was released in 2021. The newer version can run on macOS.
