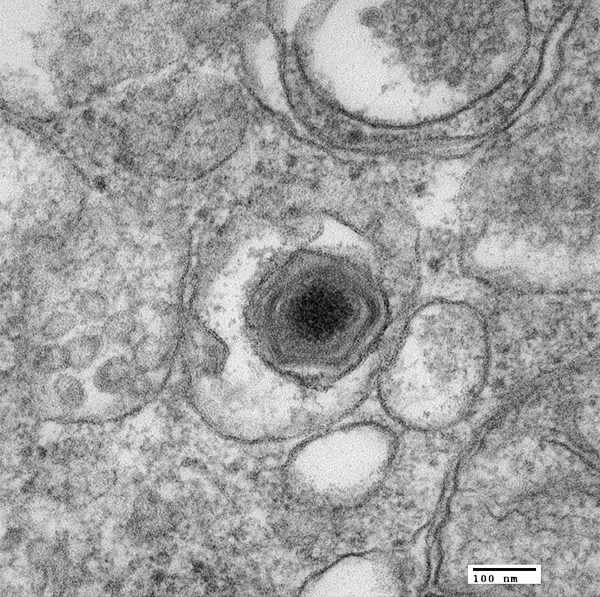
- Electron micrograph of a virus particle

Virus classification
- (unranked): Virus
- Realm: Varidnaviria
- Kingdom: Bamfordvirae
- Phylum: Nucleocytoviricota
- Class: Pokkesviricetes
- Order: Asfuvirales
- Family: Asfarviridae
- Genus: Asfivirus
- Species: Asfivirus haemorrhagiae

= African swine fever virus =

Species of virus

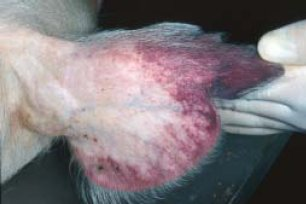
Reddening of the ears is a common sign of African swine fever in pigs.

African swine fever virus (ASFV) is a large, double-stranded DNA virus in the Asfarviridae family, and the causative virus of African swine fever (ASF). The virus causes a hemorrhagic fever with high mortality rates in domestic pigs, with some isolates capable of causing death of affected animals as quickly as within a week of being infected. ASFV persistently infects its natural hosts, including warthogs, bushpigs, and soft ticks of the genus Ornithodoros, which likely act as a vector with no outward signs of disease. ASFV does not cause disease in humans.

ASFV is endemic to sub-Saharan Africa and exists in the wild through a cycle of infection between ticks and wild pigs, bushpigs, humans and warthogs. The disease was first described after European settlers brought pigs into areas endemic with ASFV, and as such, is an example of an emerging infectious disease.

ASFV replicates in the cytoplasm of infected cells. African Swine Fever Virus is the only virus with a double-stranded DNA genome known to be transmitted by arthropods.

== Virology ==
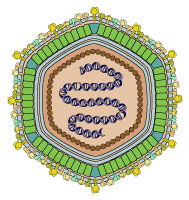
Diagram of ASFV virion

ASFV is a large (175–215 nm), icosahedral, double-stranded DNA virus with a linear genome of 189 kilobases containing more than 180 genes. The number of genes differs slightly among different isolates of the virus. ASFV has similarities to the other large DNA viruses, e.g., poxvirus, iridovirus, and mimivirus. In common with other viral hemorrhagic fevers, the main target cells for replication are those of monocyte, macrophage lineage. Entry of the virus into the host cell is receptor-mediated, but the precise mechanism of endocytosis is presently unclear.

The virus encodes enzymes required for replication and transcription of its genome, including elements of a base excision repair system, structural proteins, and many proteins that are not essential for replication in cells, but instead have roles in virus survival and transmission in its hosts. Virus replication takes place in perinuclear factory areas. It is a highly orchestrated process with at least four stages of transcription—immediate-early, early, intermediate, and late. The majority of replication and assembly occurs in discrete, perinuclear regions of the cell called virus factories, and finally progeny virions are transported to the plasma membrane along microtubules where they bud out or are propelled away along actin projections to infect new cells. As the virus progresses through its lifecycle, most if not all of the host cell's organelles are modified, adapted, or in some cases destroyed.

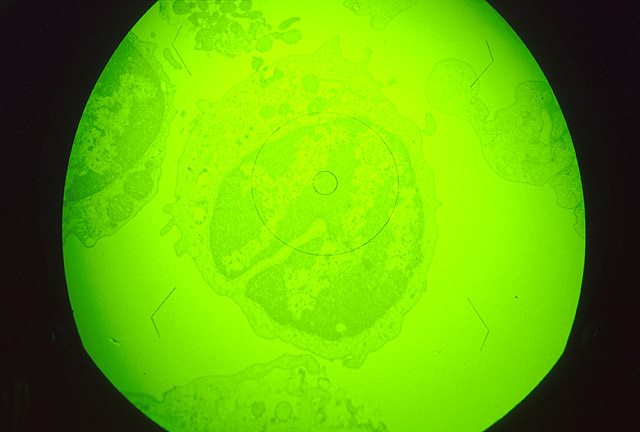
Macrophage cell in early stages of infection with ASFV

Assembly of the icosahedral capsid occurs on modified membranes from the endoplasmic reticulum. Products from proteolytically processed polyproteins form the core shell between the internal membrane and the nucleoprotein core. An additional outer membrane is gained as particles bud from the plasma membrane. The virus encodes proteins that inhibit signalling pathways in infected macrophages and thus modulate transcriptional activation of immune response genes. In addition, the virus encodes proteins which inhibit apoptosis of infected cells to facilitate production of progeny virions. Viral membrane proteins with similarity to cellular adhesion proteins modulate interaction of virus-infected cells and extracellular virions with host components.

=== Genotypes ===
Based on sequence variation in the C-terminal region of the B646L gene encoding the major capsid protein p72, 22 ASFV genotypes (I–XXIII) have been identified. All ASFV p72 genotypes have been circulating in eastern and southern Africa. Genotype I has been circulating in Europe, South America, the Caribbean, and western Africa. Genotype VIII is confined to four East African countries.

=== Evolution ===
The virus is thought to be derived from a virus of soft tick (genus Ornithodoros) that infects wild swine, including giant forest hogs (Hylochoerus meinertzhageni), warthogs (Phacochoerus africanus), and bushpigs (Potamochoerus porcus). In these wild hosts, infection is generally asymptomatic. This virus appears to have evolved around 1700 AD.

This date is corroborated by the historical record. Pigs were initially domesticated in North Africa and Eurasia. They were introduced into southern Africa from Europe and the Far East by the Portuguese (300 years ago) and Chinese (600 years ago), respectively. At the end of the 19th century, the extensive pig industry in the native region of ASFV (Kenya) started after massive losses of cattle due to a rinderpest outbreak. Pigs were imported on a massive scale for breeding by colonizers from Seychelles in 1904 and from England in 1905. Pig farming was free-range at that time. The first outbreak of ASF was reported in 1907.

=== Taxonomy ===
ASFV has no known close relatives. It is the only species in the genus Asfivirus, family Asfarviridae, and order Asfuvirales. Each of these three taxa is at least partly named after ASFV.

== Signs and symptoms ==
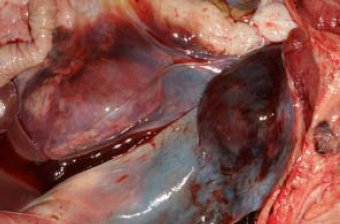
The swelling around the kidneys and the muscle hemorrhages visible here are typical of pigs with African swine fever.

In the acute form of the disease caused by highly virulent strains, pigs may develop a high fever, but show no other noticeable symptoms for the first few days. They then gradually lose their appetites and become depressed. The skin of infected pigs, particularly in areas such as the ears, abdomen, and limbs, may exhibit red or purple spots (petechiae), or widespread hemorrhagic lesions across the body. Groups of infected pigs lie huddled together shivering, breathing abnormally, and sometimes coughing. If forced to stand, they appear unsteady on their legs; this is called congenital tremor type A-I in newborn piglets. Within a few days of infection, they enter a comatose state and then die. In pregnant sows, spontaneous abortions may occur.

In milder infections, affected pigs lose weight, become thin, and develop signs of pneumonia, skin ulcers, and swollen joints.

=== Diagnosis ===
The clinical symptoms of ASFV infection are very similar to classical swine fever, and the two diseases normally have to be distinguished by laboratory diagnosis. This diagnosis is usually performed by an ELISA, real time PCR, or isolation of the virus from either the blood, lymph nodes, spleen, or serum of an infected pig.

== Spread ==
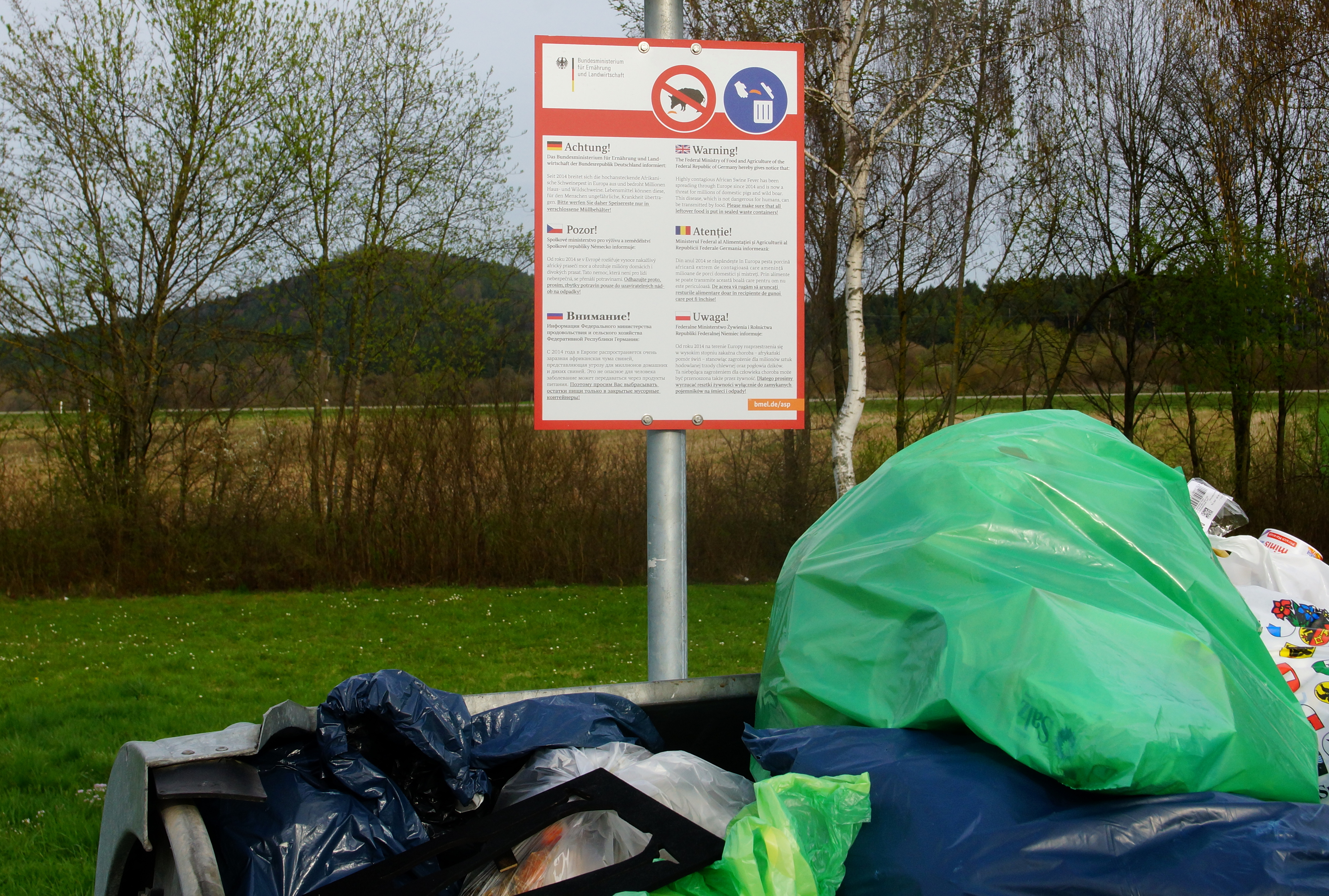
A multi-language sign in Germany telling people to dispose of waste food in closed waste bins to prevent boars eating it

The virus can be spread by ticks, but also by swine eating pork products that contain the virus. Biosecurity measures are essential for prevention and control of African swine fever. Disinfection procedures are an important asset of the mitigation phase. Laboratory tests have been conducted to assess the efficacy of chemical products and commercial disinfectants against African swine fever. The National Pig Association, a UK industry body, states that the virus can also be transmitted by direct or indirect contact with infected pigs, faeces or body fluids. As the virus may survive 11 days in pig faeces, and months or years in pork products, the association advises strict biosecurity measures for pig farms including a three-day quarantine on entering the UK, and avoiding both pigs and areas where wild boar are found.

== Vaccine research ==
Vietnam successfully produced the first vaccine against African swine fever on June 1, 2022. Against the Eurasian "Georgia07" isolate, an experimental vaccine attenuated by deletion of the viral I177L gene has been in development in the United States since January 22, 2020. This experimental vaccine was licensed as a vaccine candidate as of January 3, 2023.

== History ==
The first outbreak was retrospectively recognized as having occurred in 1907 after ASF was first described in 1921 in Kenya. The disease remained restricted to Africa until 1957, when it was reported in Lisbon, Portugal. A further outbreak occurred in Portugal in 1960. Subsequent to these initial introductions, the disease became established in the Iberian peninsula, and sporadic outbreaks occurred in France, Belgium, and other European countries during the 1980s. Both Spain and Portugal had managed to eradicate the disease by the mid-1990s through a slaughter policy.

ASFV crossed the Atlantic Ocean, and outbreaks were reported in some Caribbean islands, including Hispaniola (Dominican Republic and Haiti). As a result of this, US Customs and Border Protection is on high alert to prevent any spread to the US, which would inflict billions of dollars of damage to the pork industry in the country. Major outbreaks of ASF in Africa are regularly reported to the World Organisation for Animal Health (previously called L'office international des épizooties).

In 2018, the virus spread to Asia, affecting more than 10 percent of the total pig population in several countries, leading to severe economic losses in the pig sector.

=== Cuba ===
In 1971, an outbreak of the disease occurred in Cuba, resulting in the slaughter of 500,000 pigs to prevent a nationwide animal epidemic. The outbreak was labeled the "most alarming event" of 1971 by the United Nations Food and Agricultural Organization.

Six years after the event, the newspaper Newsday, citing untraceable sources, claimed that anti-Castro saboteurs, with at least the tacit backing of U.S. Central Intelligence Agency officials, allegedly introduced African swine fever virus into Cuba six weeks before the outbreak in 1971, to destabilize the Cuban economy and encourage domestic opposition to Fidel Castro. The virus was allegedly delivered to the operatives from an army base in the Panama Canal Zone by an unnamed U.S. intelligence source.

=== Europe ===
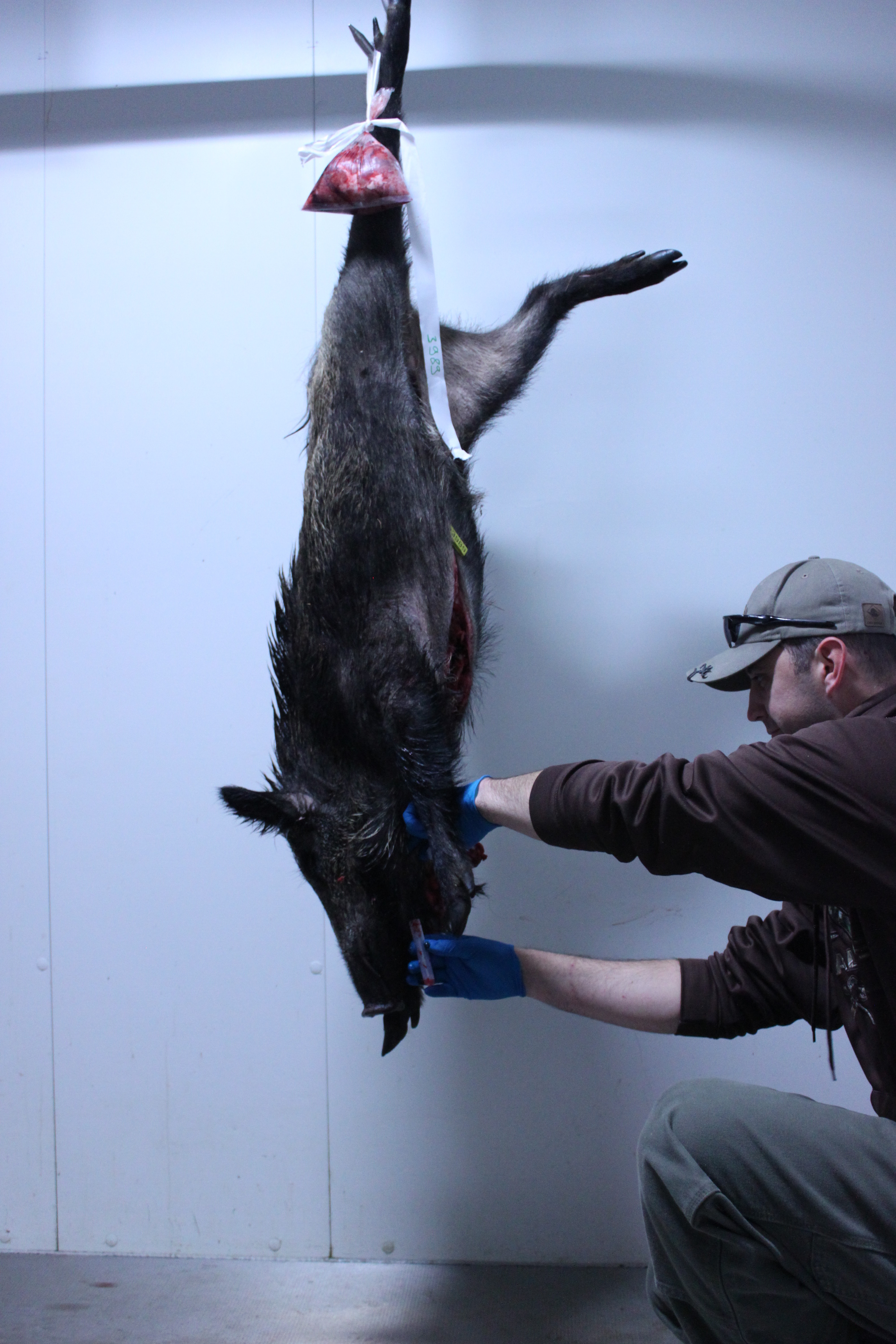
A hunter takes a blood sample for ASP testing of a wild boar he killed outside Kaiserslautern, Germany, October 2, 2018.

ASFV first occurred in Europe in 1957, when it was introduced in Portugal. From there, it spread to Spain and France. Although concerted efforts to eradicate ASFV were undertaken, such as widespread culling and the construction of modern farming facilities, the disease was only eradicated in the 1990s.

An outbreak occurred at the beginning of 2007 in Georgia, and subsequently spread to Armenia, Azerbaijan, Iran, Russia, and Belarus, raising concerns that ASFV may spread further geographically and have negative economic effects on the swine industry.

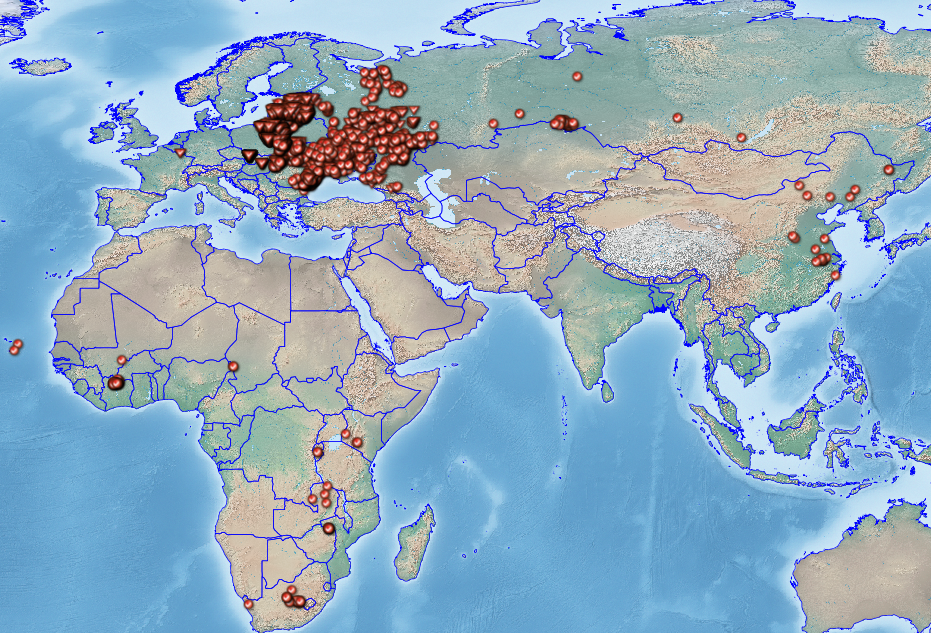
Evolution of African swine fever across the world from 1 January 2018 to 22 September 2018 in domestic swine (circles) and wild boar (triangles)

African swine fever had become endemic in the Russian Federation since spreading into the North Caucasus in November 2007, most likely through movements of infected wild boar from Georgia to Chechnya, said a 2013 report by the Food and Agriculture Organization, a United Nations agency. The report showed how the disease had spread north from the Caucasus to other parts of the country where pig production was more concentrated the Central Federal District (home to 28.8% of Russia's pigs) and the Volga Federal District (with 25.4% of the national herd) and northwest towards Ukraine, Belarus, Poland and the Baltic nations. In Russia, the report added, the disease was 'on its way to becoming endemic in Tver oblast' (about 106 km north of Moscow—and about 500 km east of Russia's littoral neighbours on the Baltic). Among the vectors for the spread in Russia of African swine fever virus was the 'distribution' of 'infected pig products' outside affected (quarantined and trade restricted) areas, travelling large distances (thousands of kilometers) within the country.

"Wholesale buyers, particularly the military food supply system, hav[ing] been implicated multiple times in the illegal distribution of contaminated meat" were vectors for the virus's spread, said the Food and Agriculture Organization report—and evidence of that was "repeated outbreaks in Leningrad oblast". The report warned that "countries immediately bordering the Russian Federation, particularly Ukraine, Moldova, Kazakhstan, and Latvia, are most vulnerable to [African swine fever] introduction and endemic establishment, largely because the biosecurity of their pig sector is predominantly low. Preventing the spread of [African swine fever] into Ukraine is particularly critical for the whole pig production sector in Europe. Given the worrisome developments in the Russian Federation, European countries have to be alert. They must be ready to prevent and to react effectively to [African swine fever] introductions into their territories for many years to come...". To stop the virus's spread, "the current scenario in the Russian Federation suggests that [prevention] should be particularly stressed at the often informal backyard level and should involve not just pig keepers, but all actors along the whole value chain—butchers, middlemen, slaughterhouses, etc. … They need to be aware of how to prevent and recognize the disease, and must understand the importance of reporting outbreaks to the national authorities … It is particularly important that [African swine fever]-free areas remain free by preventing the [re]introduction of the disease and by swiftly responding to it when it occurs".

Since around 2007 to August 31, 2018, 1367 cases of ASF of domestic pigs or wild pigs were reported by veterinary department of the Rosselkhoznadzor (Russian: Россельхознадзор), a Russian federal agency that supervises over agriculture, and state media. According to official report the central and south districts were among most affected by the disease (with several occasions on the east). Many regions effectively established local quarantines some of which was ended later.

In August 2012, an outbreak of African swine fever was reported in Ukraine.

In June 2013, an outbreak was reported in Belarus.

In January 2014, authorities announced the presence of African swine fever in Lithuania and Poland, in June 2014 in Latvia, and in July 2015 in Estonia.

Estonia in July 2015 recorded its first case of African swine fever in farmed pigs in Valgamaa on the country's border with Latvia. Another case was reported the same day in Viljandi County, which also borders Latvia. All the pigs were culled and their carcasses incinerated. Less than a month later, almost 15,000 farmed pigs had been culled and the country was "struggling to get rid of hundreds of tons of carcasses". The death toll was "expected to rise".

Latvia in January 2017 declared African swine fever emergency in relation to outbreaks in three regions, including a pig farm in Krimulda region, that resulted in a cull of around 5,000 sows and piglets by using gas. In February, another massive pig cull was required, after an industrial-scale farm of the same company in Salaspils region was found infected, leading to a cull of about 10,000 pigs.

In June 2017, the Czech Republic recorded its historically first case of African swine fever. The veterinary administration of Zlin prevented the spread of the ASF infection by confining the contaminated zone via odor fences. Odor fences with a total length of 44.5 km were effective in keeping wild boar inside the health zone.

In 2018, Romania experienced a nationwide African swine fever pandemic, which prompted the slaughter of most pig farmers' stock. By the end of November 2022 from the first detection in the country in 2017, 5920 outbreaks on farms had been confirmed by the country's National Veterinary and Food Safety Authority (ANSVSA) and nearly 2 million pigs had been culled in the fight against ASF.

In August 2018, authorities announced the first outbreak of African swine fever in Bulgaria. By July 2019 five Bulgarian pig farms had had outbreaks of African swine fever.

In September 2018, an outbreak occurred in wild boars in southern Belgium. Professional observers suspect that importation of wild boars from Eastern Europe by game hunters was the origin of the virus. By 4 October, 32 wild boars had tested positive for the virus. For control of the outbreak, 4,000 domestic pigs were slaughtered preventively in the Gaume region, and the forest was declared off-limits for recreation.

In July 2019, authorities announced the first outbreak of African swine fever in Slovakia.

In February 2020, authorities announced the first outbreak of African swine fever in a restricted area of Northern Greece.

In September 2020, the German agriculture minister confirmed on a press conference that the African swine fever virus reached Germany. The virus was discovered on a wild boar carcass, which the test results confirmed all as positive results. The dead boar was located in the district of Spree-Neisse, Brandenburg, just a few kilometres from the Polish border. The dead animal had been there for quite a while according to the Friedrich-Loeffler Institute, which was the agency hired for testing. Following these events, the German government tried to lobby China and other Asian countries to allow West German states to keep exporting to Asia, while barring their own eastern states from doing so; the Asian countries ultimately refused these proposals.

In January 2021, Romania suffered again from a new breakout of the ASFV that started in the Brăila County.

In January 2022, an outbreak occurred in northern Italy, detected on some dead wild boars in Liguria and in Piedmont.

In January 2022, ASF cases were reported in northern Italy, Latvia, and Hungary.

In September 2023, one case was reported from Sweden.

In November 2025, two cases were reported near Barcelona, Spain. By April 2026, during culling of 24,000 animals, 232 cases had been detected.

In July 2026, ASF was found in dead wild boar piglets in Virolahti, Finland, near the border of Russia.

=== 2018–2020 African swine fever panzootic ===
==== China and East Asia ====
In August 2018, China reported the first African swine fever outbreak in Liaoning province, which was also the first reported case in East Asia. By September 1, 2018, the country had culled more than 38,000 hogs. Since the week of September 10, 2018, China has blocked transports of live pigs and pig products in a large part of the country to avoid spread beyond the 6 provinces where the virus was then confirmed. By the end of 2018, the outbreaks had been reported in 23 provinces and municipalities across China. On April 25, 2019, the virus was reported to have spread to every region of China, as well as parts of Southeast Asia, including Cambodia, Laos, Thailand, and Vietnam. The Chinese population was reported to have declined by almost 100 million compared with the previous year, driving European pork prices to reach a six-year high.

Ze Chen, Shan Gao and co-workers from Nankai University detected ASFV in Dermacentor (hard ticks) from sheep and bovines using small RNA sequencing. This 235-bp segment had an identity of 99% to a 235-bp DNA segment of ASFV and contained three single nucleotide mutations (C38T, C76T and A108C). C38T, resulting in a single amino-acid mutation G66D, suggests the existence of a new ASFV strain, which is different from all reported ASFV strains in the NCBI Genbank database and the ASFV strain (GenBank: MH713612.1) reported in China in 2018. In December 2019, China banned imports of pigs and wild boars from Indonesia because of African swine fever outbreaks that reached 392 on 17 December.

In September 2019, South Korea confirmed a second case of ASF at a pig farm in Yeoncheon, where 4,700 pigs had been raised, a day after reporting its first-ever outbreak of the virus. As of 31 October 2019, the virus has been detected in domestic pigs in nine places in Gyeonggi-do and five places in Incheon City. It was also confirmed in 18 wild boars from Gangwon-do and Gyeonggi-do, inside or near the Civilian Control Zone.

The South Korean government set a buffer zone to separate affected areas from the rest of the country and instituted a compensation scheme for farms within 10 km (6.2 mi) of infected farms.

In Taiwan, between December 2018 and June 2019, ten pig carcasses infected with ASF washed up on the shore in Kinmen (Quemoy) County. In June 2019, the Taiwanese government temporarily halted export of pigs and pork products from Kinmen County after two infected pig carcasses were discovered on the shore. Nearby farms were inspected by veterinarians and no live pigs tested positive for ASF. On February 3, 2020, another infected pig carcass was discovered on the shore of Lieyu (Lesser Kinmen), bringing the total number of infected pig carcasses found on Kinmen county shores to 11. In April 2020, a twelfth pig carcass confirmed to be carrying African swine fever virus washed up on the shore of Lieyu (Lesser Kinmen). After testing, no outbreak of the disease was detected in the seven active hog farms on the island.

On May 29, China's Ministry of Agriculture and Rural Affairs said it had found a new outbreak of ASF near the city of Lanzhou in northwestern Gansu Province.

On April 9, 2019, a pig carcass with ASF was discovered on the shore of Nangan in the Matsu Islands (Lienchiang County) leading to a week-long ban on the transport of pigs from the county.

In 2021, new strains of the African swine fever virus emerged in China, believed to be related to unlicensed vaccine. China's Ministry of Agriculture and Rural Affairs said it would test pigs for different strains of the virus as part of a nationwide investigation into illegal vaccine use.

==== Southeast Asia ====
The Philippines' Department of Agriculture started a probe in August 2019 regarding incidents of hog deaths in towns in Rizal and Bulacan for suspected ASF cases. The department ordered the culling of pigs within a 1-kilometre (0.62 mi) radius of affected farms.

The first case of African swine fever in the Philippines was confirmed on 9 September 2019 by the country's agriculture department. The department sent 20 blood samples to the United Kingdom for testing, with 14 samples testing positive for African swine fever virus. At the time of the confirmation, though, the department has stated that the disease has not reached epidemic levels yet and is still assessing its severity.

On 16 September 2019, the Bureau of Animal Industry's director, Ronnie Domingo, confirmed that the status of the virus in the country is in an outbreak level in Rizal, Bulacan, and Quezon City, and also confirmed across the provinces of Pampanga and Pangasinan in the end of September.

Vietnam confirmed its first case of African swine fever on 19 February 2019. As of 31 October 2019, all 63 provinces / municipalities have reported outbreaks, and more than 5,700,000 pigs have been culled.

The Vietnamese government acted to limit movement of pigs and pig products and implemented measures to prevent, promptly detect, and strictly handle cases of smuggling, illegal transportation, and trafficking of animals and animal products—especially of pigs and pig products—into the country.

ASF was reported on farms near the capital city, Dili, in East Timor from 9 September 2019. On 30 September 2019, a reported 405 animals were killed or culled. By the end of October 2019, a total of 100 outbreaks in smallholder pig farms had been recorded in Dili.

In Sabah, Malaysia, outbreaks of ASF had been detected in domestic pigs by February 2021. However, large numbers of dead wild pigs had been reported dead since January, and over a hundred Bornean bearded pigs had been found dead as of March 2021; the Sabah Wildlife Department later stated that it was probably due to ASF. Other Southeast Asian pig species are thought to also be vulnerable including the (Sulawesi) Celebes warty pig.

The virus was first detected in Singapore in wild pigs on 5 February 2023, where wild pig mortality was estimated to be over 98% on the island of Pulau Ubin, but lower on the main island of Singapore. The disease triggered an ecological cascade that likely led to the spike in greater mouse-deer population on Pulau Ubin.

==== India ====
On 29 April 2020, India reported the first ASF disease outbreak in the states of Assam and Arunachal Pradesh. The disease reportedly is being spread via transboundary transmission from China. According to the data available with the veterinary department, over 15,000 pigs had been recorded dead from the 9 affected districts so far in Assam, viz. Golaghat, Majuli, Dibrugarh, Kamrup, Dhemaji, Biswanath, North Lakhimpur, Sivasagar, and Jorhat. Sale and consumption of pork meat have been banned in the affected districts of Assam. On 4 July, the test results of certain pig carcass samples came in as a confirmation for ASF in Bokakhat subdivision of Golaghat. The pig mortality reached around 800 in number in Bokakhat. The infection was suspected to have come into the region from Kamargaon, which is located near Bokakhat.

Ghana

At the end of March 2025, an outbreak of African Swine Fever (ASF) happened in Damongo, the capital of Ghana's Savannah Region, killing hundreds of pigs. The affected communities included Canteen, Attributu, Boroto, and Sori Number One. To contain the spread, farmers are slaughtering and burying sick pigs. This outbreak has significantly impacted pig farmers, many of whom are still recovering from a previous outbreak in 2023.

==== North Korea ====
In 2019, North Korea reported to the World Organization for Animal Health that 77 of the 99 pigs at a farm in Jagang province died of the disease and another 22 pigs were culled.

== Historical theories ==
The appearance of ASF outside Africa at about the same time as the emergence of AIDS led to some interest in whether the two were related, and a report appeared in The Lancet supporting this in 1986. However, the realization that the human immunodeficiency virus (HIV) causes AIDS discredited any potential connection with ASF.

== See also ==
- Veterinary virology
