= Algal bloom =

Spread of planktonic algae in water

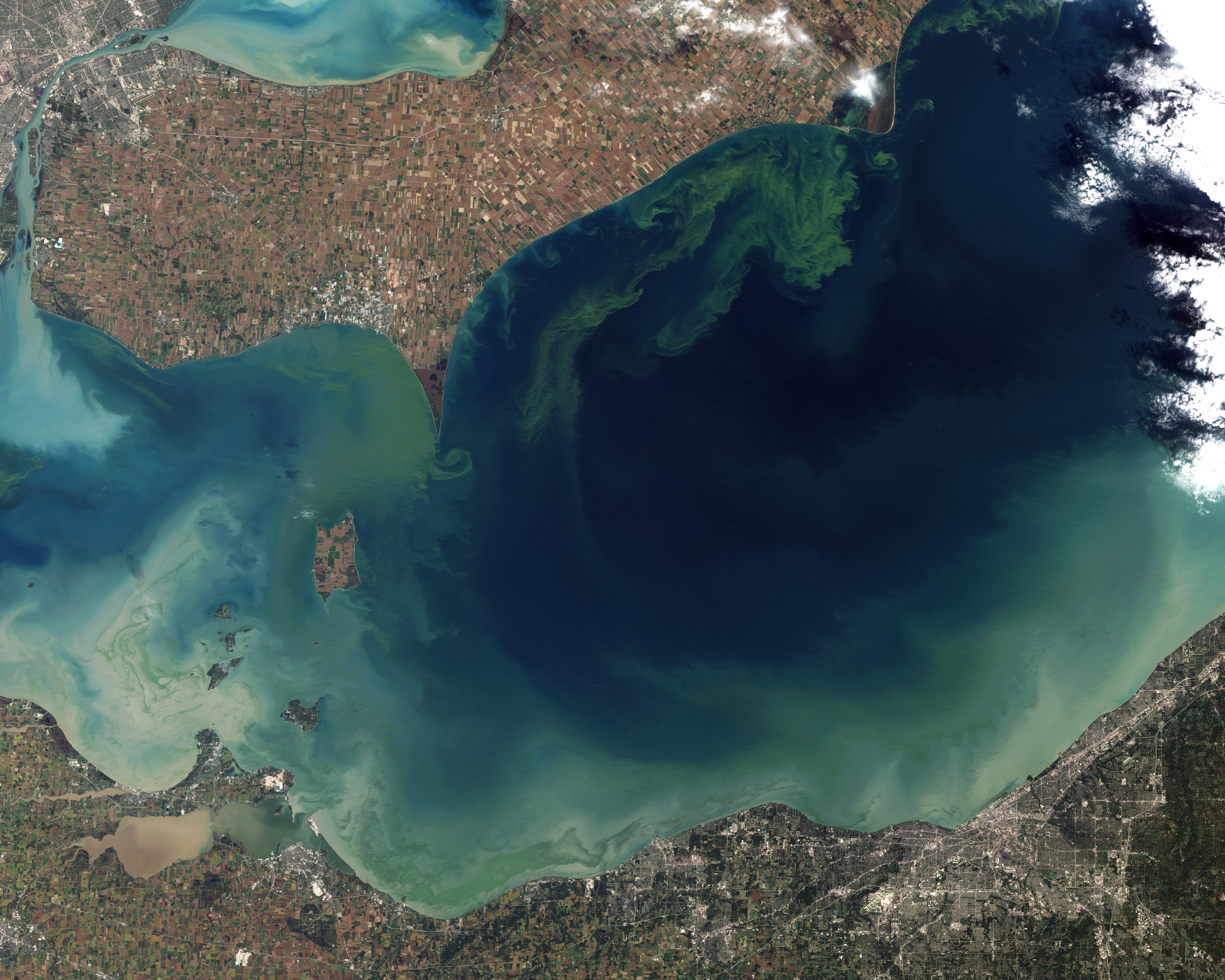
A very large algae bloom in Lake Erie, North America, which can be seen from space.

An algal bloom or algae bloom is a rapid increase or accumulation in the population of algae in fresh water or marine water systems. It may be a benign or harmful algal bloom.

Algal bloom is often recognized by the discoloration in the water from the algae's pigments. The term algae encompasses many types of aquatic photosynthetic organisms, both macroscopic multicellular organisms like seaweed and microscopic unicellular organisms like cyanobacteria. Algal bloom commonly refers to the rapid growth of microscopic unicellular algae, not macroscopic algae. An example of a macroscopic algal bloom is a kelp forest.

Algal blooms are the result of a nutrient, like nitrogen or phosphorus from various sources (for example fertilizer runoff or other forms of nutrient pollution), entering the aquatic system and causing excessive growth of algae. An algal bloom affects the whole ecosystem.

Consequences range from benign effects, such as feeding of higher trophic levels, to more harmful effects like blocking sunlight from reaching other organisms, causing a depletion of oxygen levels in the water, and, depending on the organism, releasing toxins into the water. Yet, algae also play a crucial role by producing about 70% of Earth's oxygen, which supports terrestrial life. Blooms that can injure animals or the ecology, especially those blooms where toxins are secreted by the algae, are usually called "harmful algal blooms" (HAB), and can lead to fish die-offs, cities cutting off water to residents, or states having to close fisheries. The process of the oversupply of nutrients leading to algae growth and oxygen depletion is called eutrophication.

Algal and bacterial blooms have persistently contributed to mass extinctions driven by global warming in the geologic past, such as during the end-Permian extinction driven by Siberian Traps volcanism and during the biotic recovery following the mass extinction (by delaying the recovery).

== Description ==
The term algal bloom is defined inconsistently depending on the scientific field, and can range from a "minibloom" of harmless algae to a large, harmful bloom event. Since algae is a broad term including organisms of widely varying sizes, growth rates, and nutrient requirements, there is no officially recognized threshold level as to what is defined as a bloom. Because there is no scientific consensus, blooms can be described and quantified in several ways: measurements of new algal biomass, the concentration of photosynthetic pigment, quantification of the bloom's negative effect, or relative concentration of the algae compared to the rest of the microbial community. For example, definitions of blooms have included:

- concentration of chlorophyll exceeding 5-100 μg/L,
- concentration of the species considered to be blooming in excess of 1000 cells/mL, and
- algae species concentration simply deviating from its normal growth.

Blooms are the result of a nutrient needed by the particular algae being introduced to the local aquatic system. This growth-limiting nutrient is typically nitrogen or phosphorus, but can also be iron, vitamins, or amino acids. There are several mechanisms for the addition of these nutrients to the water. In the open ocean and along coastlines, upwelling from both winds and topographical ocean floor features can draw nutrients to the photic, or sunlit zone of the ocean. Along coastal regions and in freshwater systems, agricultural, city, and sewage runoff can cause algal blooms.

Algal blooms, especially large algal bloom events, can reduce the transparency of the water and can discolor it. The photosynthetic pigments in the algal cells, like chlorophyll and photoprotective pigments, determine the color of the algal bloom. Depending on the organism, its pigments, and the depth in the water column, algal blooms can be green, red, brown, golden, or purple. Bright green blooms in freshwater systems are frequently a result of cyanobacteria (colloquially known as "blue-green algae") such as Microcystis. Blooms may also consist of macroalgal (non-phytoplanktonic) species. These blooms are recognizable by large blades of algae that may wash up onto the shoreline.

Once the nutrient is present in the water, the algae begin to grow at a much faster rate than usual. In a mini bloom, this fast growth benefits the whole ecosystem by providing food and nutrients for other organisms.

Of particular note are the harmful algal blooms (HABs), which are algal bloom events involving toxic or otherwise harmful phytoplankton. Many species can cause harmful algal blooms. For example,

- Gymnodinium nagasakiense can cause harmful red tides,
- dinoflagellates Gonyaulax polygramma can cause oxygen depletion and result in large fish kills,
- cyanobacteria Microcystis aeruginosa can make toxins, and
- diatom Chaetoceros convolutus can damage fish gills.
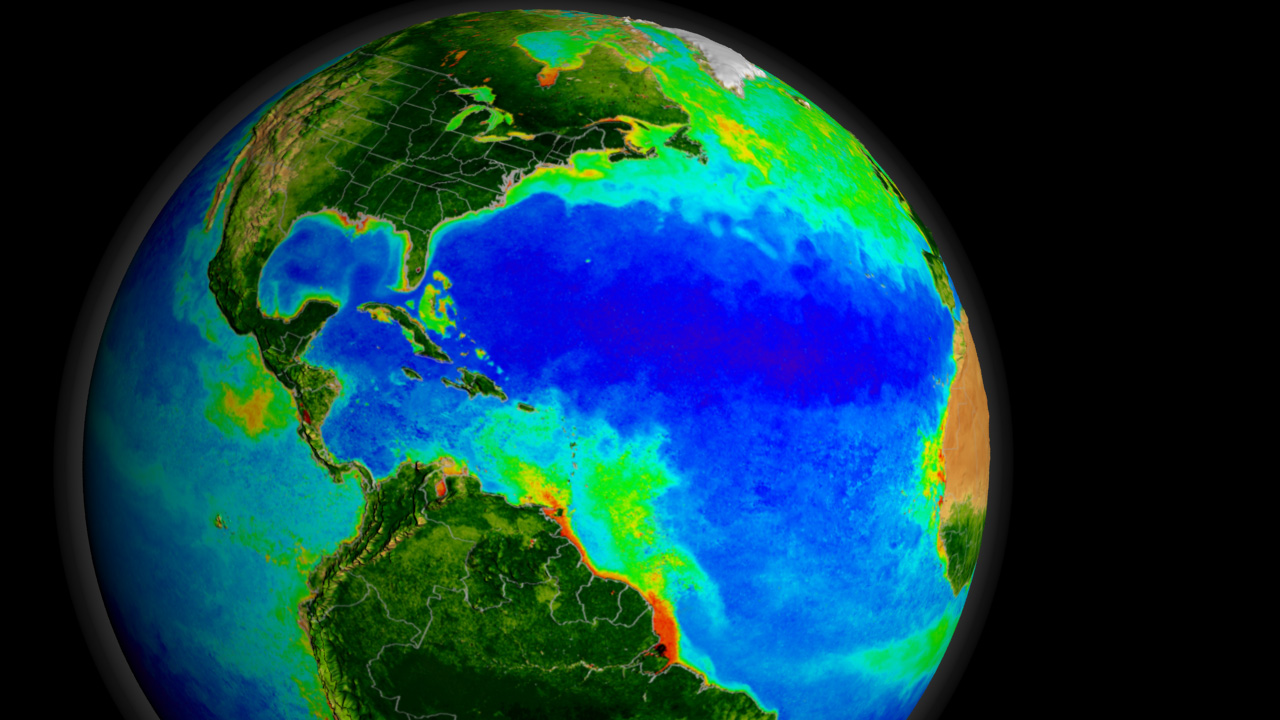
Rivers, such as the Amazon, deposit nutrients from land into South America's tropical ocean waters, leading to thick blooms along the coastline.

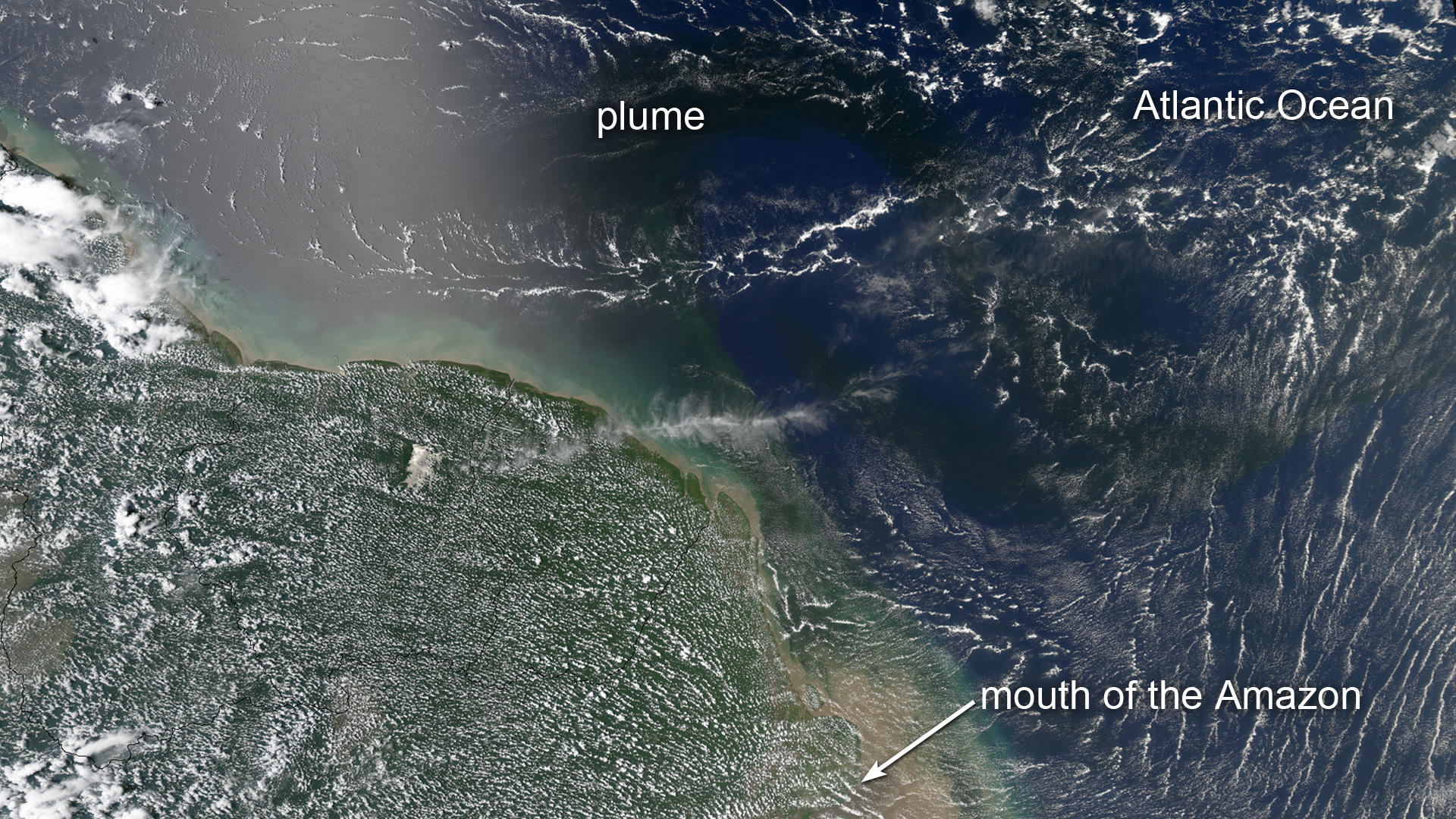
Blooms flourish in a dark plume of nutrient-rich water pouring from the mouth of the Amazon River, as seen by NASA's Aqua satellite.

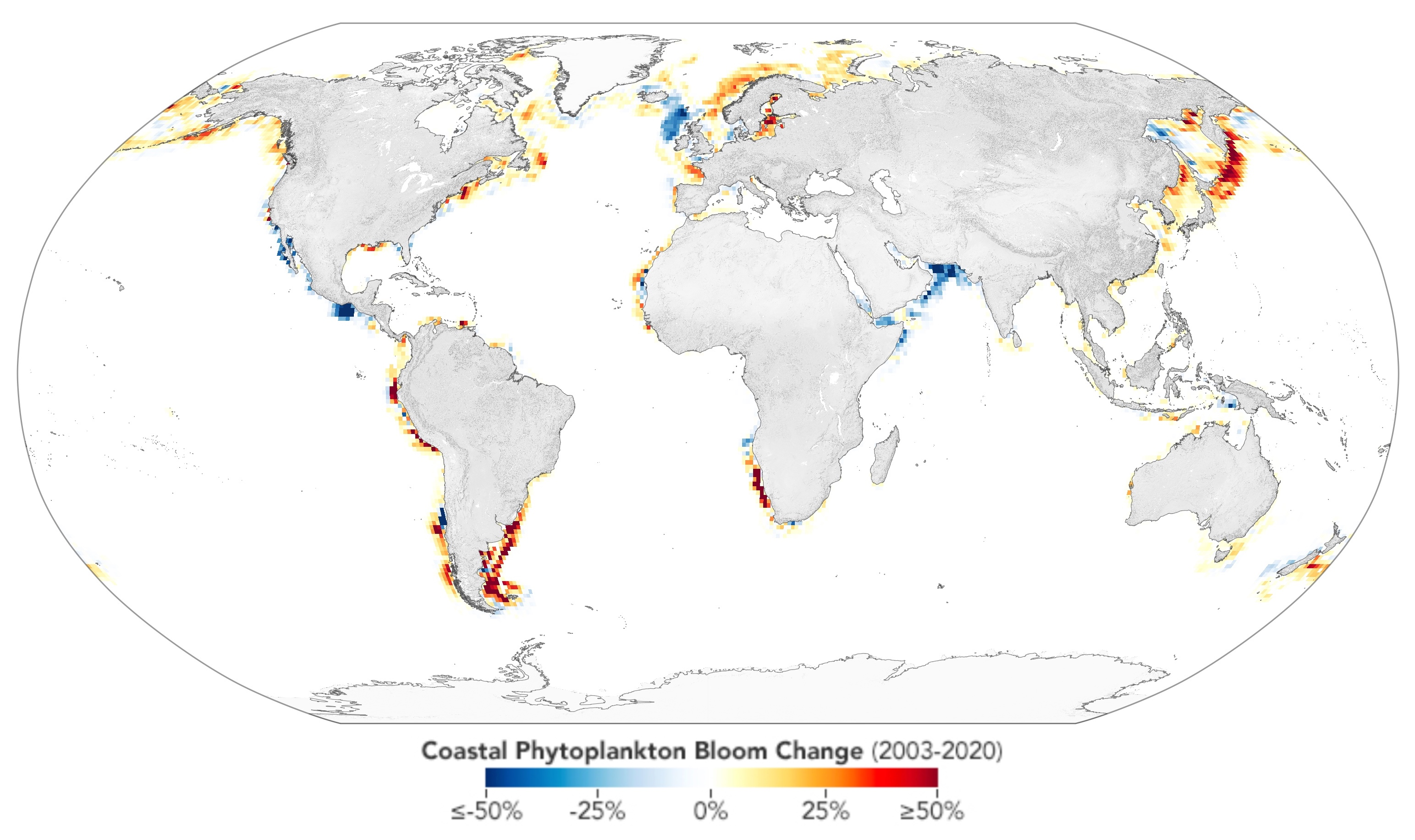
Coastal phytoplankton bloom change 2003–2020.

== Freshwater algal blooms ==
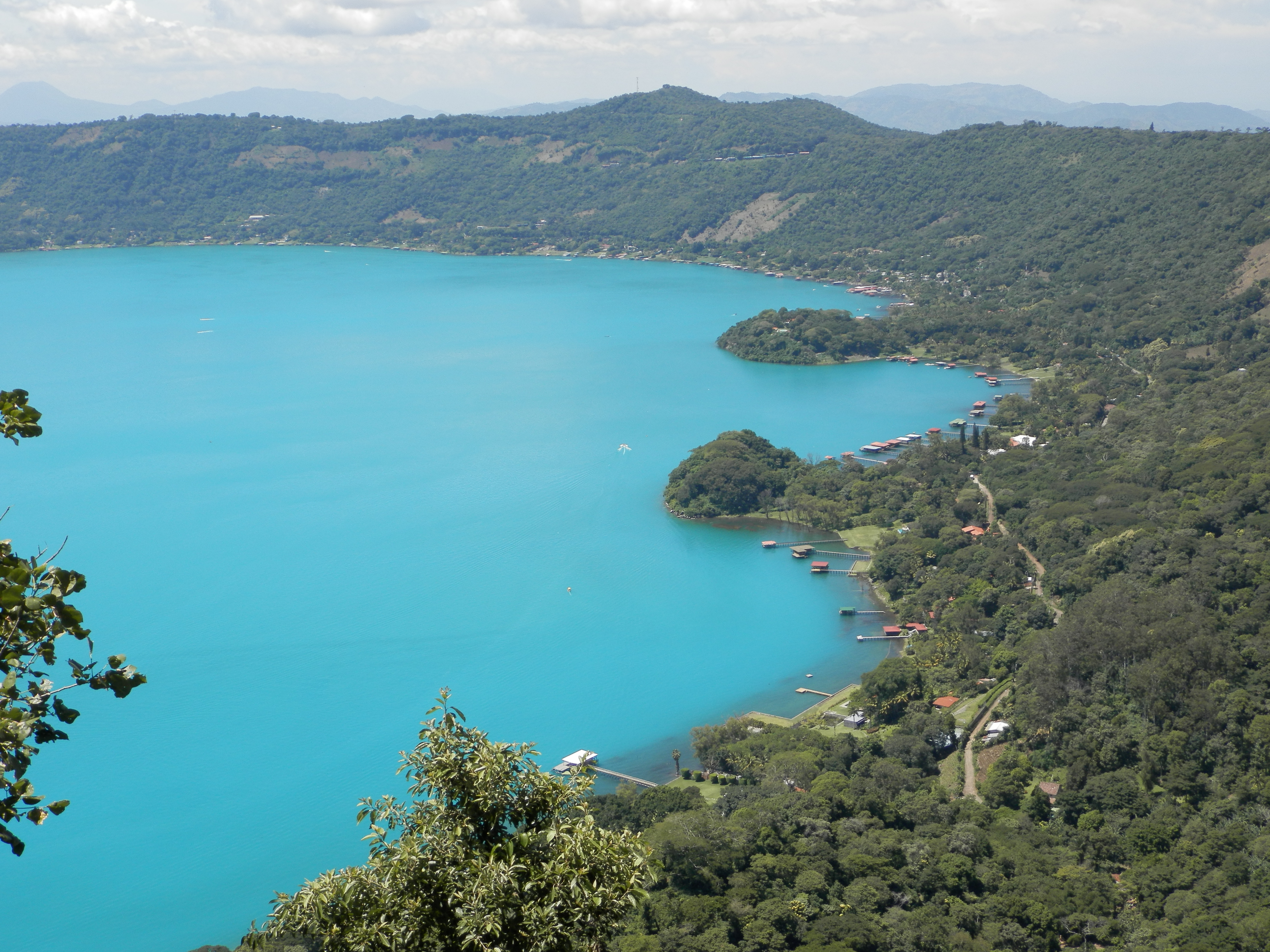
Cyanobacteria activity turns Coatepeque Caldera lake into a turquoise color.

Freshwater algal blooms are the result of an excess of nutrients, particularly some phosphates. Excess nutrients may originate from fertilizers that are applied to land for agricultural or recreational purposes and may also originate from household cleaning products containing phosphorus.

The reduction of phosphorus inputs is required to mitigate blooms that contain cyanobacteria. In lakes that are stratified in the summer, autumn turnover can release substantial quantities of bio-available phosphorus potentially triggering algal blooms as soon as sufficient photosynthetic light is available. Excess nutrients can enter watersheds through water runoff. Excess carbon and nitrogen have also been suspected as causes. Presence of residual sodium carbonate acts as catalyst for the algae to bloom by providing dissolved carbon dioxide for enhanced photosynthesis in the presence of nutrients.

When phosphates are introduced into water systems, higher concentrations can cause increased growth of algae and plants. Algae tend to grow very quickly under high nutrient availability, but each alga is short-lived, and the result is a high concentration of dead organic matter which starts to decompose. Natural decomposers present in the water begin decomposing the dead algae, consuming dissolved oxygen present in the water during the process. This can result in a sharp decrease in available dissolved oxygen for other aquatic life. Without sufficient dissolved oxygen in the water, animals and plants may die off in large numbers. This may also be known as a dead zone.

Blooms may be observed in freshwater aquariums when fish are overfed and excess nutrients are not absorbed by plants. These are generally harmful for fish, and the situation can be corrected by changing the water in the tank and then reducing the amount of food given.

=== Natural causes of algal blooms ===
Algal blooms in freshwater systems are not always caused by human contamination and have been observed to occur naturally in both eutrophic and oligotrophic lakes. Eutrophic lakes contain an abundance of nutrients such as nitrogen and phosphates which increase the likelihood for blooms. Oligotrophic lakes don't contain much of these nutrients. Oligotrophic lakes are defined by various degrees of scarcity. The trophic state index (TSI) measures nutrients in freshwater systems and a TSI under 30 defines oligotrophic waters. Algal blooms in oligotrophic bodies of water have also been observed. This is a result of cyanobacteria which cause blooms in eutrophic lakes and oligotrophic lakes despite the latter containing a lack of natural and man-made nutrients.

==== Nutrient uptake and cyanobacteria ====
A cause for algal blooms in nutrient-lacking environments come in the form of nutrient uptake. Cyanobacteria have evolved to have better nutrient uptake in oligotrophic waters. Cyanobacteria utilize nitrogen and phosphates in their biological processes. Because of this, cyanobacteria are known to be important in the nitrogen and phosphate fixing cycle in oligotrophic waters. Cyanobacteria can fix nitrogen by accessing atmospheric nitrogen (N_{2}) that has been dissolved into water and transforming it into nitrogen accessible to other organisms. This higher amount of nitrogen is then able to sustain large algae blooms in oligotrophic waters.

Cyanobacteria are able to retain high phosphorus uptake in the absence of nutrients which help their success in oligotrophic environments. Cyanobacteria species such as D. lemmermannii are able to move between the hypolimnion which is rich in nutrients such as phosphates and the nutrient-poor metalimnion which lacks phosphates. This causes phosphates to be brought up to the metalimnion and give organisms an abundance of phosphates, exacerbating the likelihood for algal blooms.

==== Upwelling of nutrients ====
Upwelling events happen when nutrients such as phosphates and nitrogen are moved from the nutrient dense hypolimnion to the nutrient poor metalimnion. This happens as result of geological processes such as seasonal overturn when lake surfaces freeze or melt, prompting mixing due to changing water densities mixing up the composition of limnion layers and mixing nutrients around the system. This overabundance in nutrients leads to blooms.

== Marine algal blooms ==
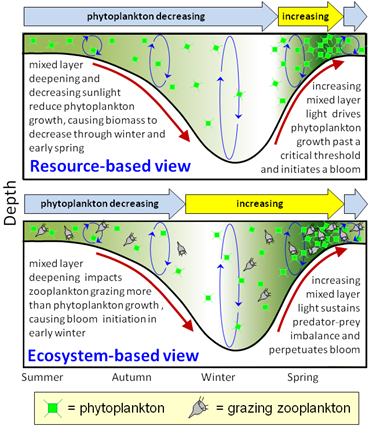
Competing hypothesis of plankton variability

Turbulent storms churn the ocean in summer, adding nutrients to sunlit waters near the surface. This sparks a feeding frenzy each spring that gives rise to massive blooms of phytoplankton. Tiny molecules found inside these microscopic plants harvest vital energy from sunlight through photosynthesis. The natural pigments, called chlorophyll, allow phytoplankton to thrive in Earth's oceans and enable scientists to monitor blooms from space.

Satellites reveal the location and abundance of phytoplankton by detecting the amount of chlorophyll present in coastal and open waters—the higher the concentration, the larger the bloom. Observations show blooms typically last until late spring or early summer, when nutrient stocks are in decline and predatory zooplankton start to graze. The visualization on the left immediately below uses NASA SeaWiFS data to map bloom populations.

The NAAMES study conducted between 2015 and 2019 investigated aspects of phytoplankton dynamics in ocean ecosystems, and how such dynamics influence atmospheric aerosols, clouds, and climate.

In France, citizens are requested to report coloured waters through the project PHENOMER. This helps to understand the occurrence of marine blooms.

Wildfires can cause phytoplankton blooms via oceanic deposition of wildfire aerosols.

== Harmful algal blooms ==
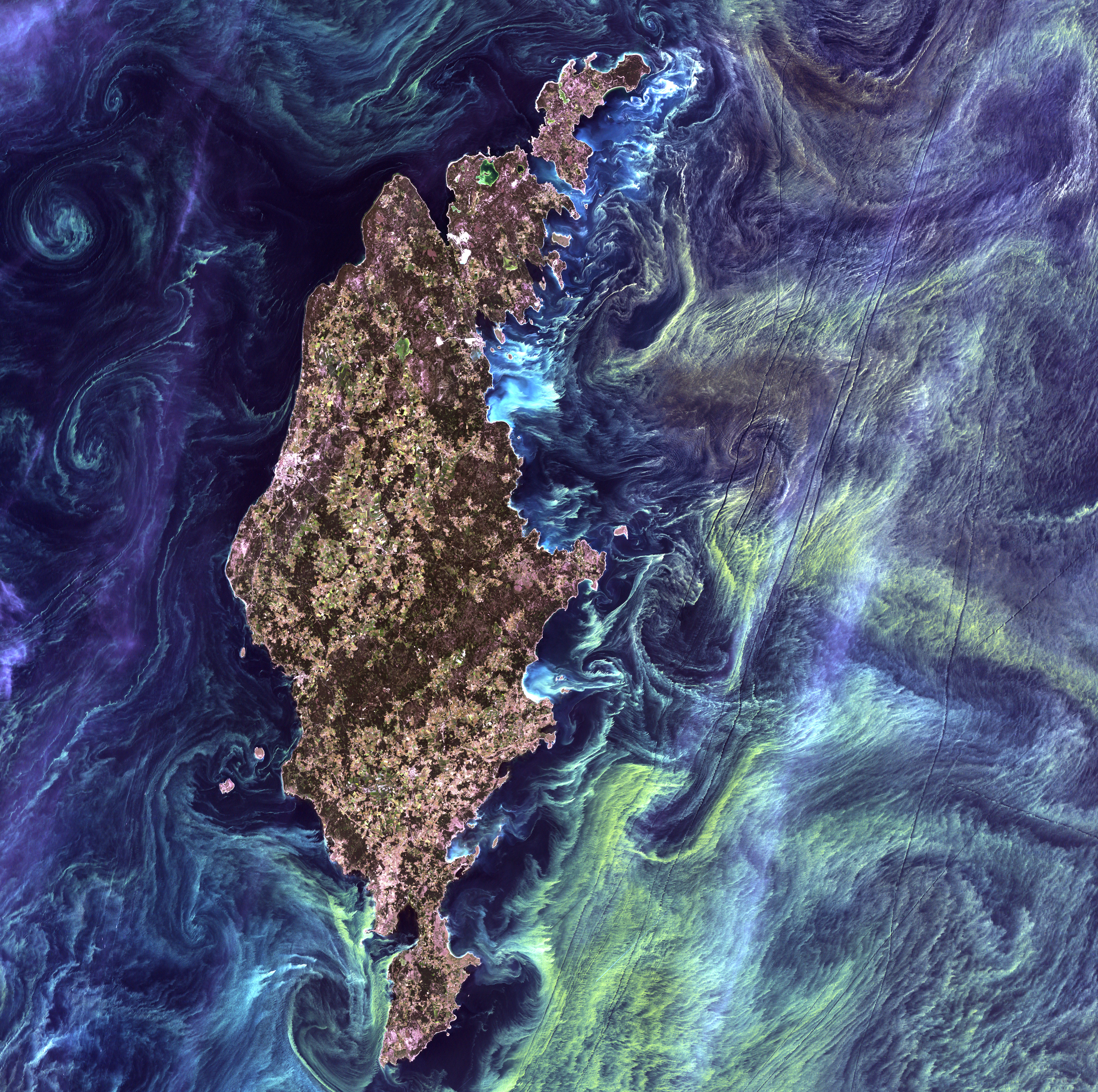
A satellite image of phytoplankton swirling around the Swedish island of Gotland in the Baltic Sea, 2005

A harmful algal bloom (HAB) is an algal bloom that causes negative impacts to other organisms via production of natural toxins, mechanical damage to other organisms, or by other means. The diversity of these HABs make them even harder to manage, and present many issues, especially to threatened coastal areas. HABs are often associated with large-scale marine mortality events and have been associated with various types of shellfish poisonings. Due to their negative economic and health impacts, HABs are often carefully monitored.

HAB has been proved to be harmful to humans. Humans may be exposed to toxic algae by direct consuming seafood containing toxins, swimming or other activities in water, and breathing tiny droplets in the air that contain toxins. Because human exposure can take place by consuming seafood products that contain the toxins expelled by HAB algae, food-borne diseases are present and can affect the nervous, digestive, respiratory, hepatic, dermatological, and cardiac systems in the body.

Beach users have often experienced upper respiratory diseases, eye and nose irritation, fever, and have often needed medical care in order to be treated. Ciguatera fish poisoning (CFP) is very common from the exposure of algal blooms. Water-borne diseases are also present as our drinking waters can be contaminated by cyanotoxins.

If the HAB event results in a high enough concentration of algae the water may become discoloured or murky, varying in colour from purple to almost pink, normally being red or green. Not all algal blooms are dense enough to cause water discolouration.

=== Bioluminescence ===
Dinoflagellates are microbial eukaryotes that link bioluminesce and toxin production in algal blooms. They use a luciferin-luciferase reaction to create a blue light emission glow. There are seventeen major types of dinoflagellate toxins, in which the strains, Saxitoxin and Yessotoxin, are both bioluminescent and toxic. These two strains are found to have similar niches in coastal areas. A surplus of Dinoflagellates in the night time creates a blue-green glow, however, in the day, it presents as a red brown color which names algal blooms, Red Tides. Dinoflagellates have been reported to be the cause of seafood poisoning from the neurotoxins.

== Monitoring and forecasting ==
Historically, forecasting algal blooms relied heavily on physical water sampling and hydrodynamic modeling. While accurate, these methods can be resource-intensive and struggle to rapidly process highly complex, changing environmental variables. Consequently, modern forecasting increasingly integrates remote sensing with machine learning to complement traditional physical models.

Open-science initiatives have helped accelerate these algorithmic approaches. For example, during the 2019 NASA International Space Apps Challenge, a student team demonstrated how convolutional neural networks could analyze satellite data to predict cyanobacteria concentrations up to a month in advance. In formal scientific literature, recent frameworks employ self-supervised deep learning to fuse multi-sensor and hyperspectral satellite datasets. These models help generate early warning systems for coastal communities and water treatment facilities.

Despite these advancements, satellite-based forecasting faces inherent limitations. Algorithmic accuracy depends heavily on accounting for highly localized factors, such as regional eutrophication or sudden water temperature shifts. Furthermore, optical satellite measurements are frequently obstructed by cloud cover, requiring predictive models to rely on data interpolation to bridge missing gaps.

== Management ==
There are three major categories for management of algal blooms consisting of mitigation, prevention, and control. Within mitigation, routine monitoring programs are implemented for toxins in shellfish for early warnings and an overall surveillance of the area to monitor and quantify harmful algal blooms. The HAB levels of the shellfish will be determined and can manage restrictions to keep contaminated shellfish off the food market. Moving fish pens away from algal blooms is also another form of mitigation.

Within prevention, we can reduce surface runoff carrying excess nutrients by increasing the amount of permeable surfaces and vegetation. Permeable surfaces help absorb the runoff before it can make its way into the waterway. We can put into place permeable streets and parking lots which help allow for the pollution from vehicles and other runoff nutrients to be soaked up and/or slowed.

Vegetation filters, absorbs, and slows the runoff which also helps to reduce the amount of excess nutrients making their way into the waterway. Examples of planted vegetation to help reduce runoff include rain gardens, replacing grass with native plants, planting trees in yards and along waterways, and even rooftop gardens. Farmers can reduce their impact on our waterways by planting cover crops, planting forested buffers, reducing their fertilizer use, and putting up fences to keep livestock out of streams.

Within control, there are mechanical, biological, chemical, genetic and environmental controls. Mechanical control involves dispersing clay into the water to aggregate with the HAB leading to less of these HAB to go through the process of sedimentation. Biological control varies largely and can be used through pheromones or releasing sterile males to reduce reproduction. Chemical control uses toxic chemical release. However, it may cause problems of mortality of other non targeted organisms. Genetic control involves genetically engineering species in their environmental tolerances and reproduction processes. However, there are problems of harming indigenous organisms. For environmental control, it can use water circulation and aeration.

== Environmental impacts ==
Harmful algae blooms have many negative environmental impacts and is a worsening issue that is spreading in area. A tiny brown tide organism that was formerly restricted to the northeastern US and South Africa, is now causing massive blooms along the coast of China which is similar to that of other brown tides. HABs can lead to anaerobic (lack of oxygen) environments which can kill any organisms living within the water, fish poisoning, respiratory problems and illness among beach goers.

HABs have a large effect on the Great Lakes St. Lawrence River Basin. Invasive zebra and quagga mussels are positively correlated with their impact on the environment. These mussels increase the cycling of phosphorus which therefore increases harmful algae blooms in areas they are present. Harmful algae blooms continue to infect water supplies at the Binational Great Lakes Basin and due to the world's recovery from the COVID-19 pandemic, solving the issue has become a low priority. This economical problem has become part of politics in the United States, whereas in allied countries such as Canada there is low concern.

The impact of harmful algae blooms on the environment have a substantial effect on marine life. For example, in August 2024 the growth of the toxic algae, Pseudo-nitzschia, along California coasts were making sea lions sick and aggressive to beach goers. Scientists claim this is a seasonal occurrence. The growth of Pseudo-nitzschia leads to the production of a dominic acid which accumulates in fishes such as sardines, anchovies, and squids. This directly affects the food web and the primary food source of sea lions. Once the toxins are transferred via consumption, they can cause seizures, brain damage, and death to the animal. During this surge, people reported bites and unpredictable, aggressive behavior from the infected sea lions. In this sickened state, the sea lions are scared and act out of fear in order to protect themselves. Pregnant sea lions are most vulnerable to toxic algae poisoning and are more likely to die from the effects.

== Impact of climate change ==
In recent decades, the intensity and occurrence of algae blooms has increased. This is primarily due to the heating of oceans and other bodies of water, which stimulates algae growth, and also extends the growing season. However, climate change can also result in a decrease in algae blooms, due to intense rainfall that can flush the blooms out of bodies of water.

Moreover, the distribution of algae blooms has been predicted to expand north, particularly in the North Sea, in the next century.

== Human interference ==
Alongside climate change, the increase in algae blooms can be attributed to human practices. In agriculture, the use of fertilizers can provide the necessary nutrients for algae growth, and enter the water cycle from surface runoff.

== Fossil record ==
The first algal bloom in the world is Eoseira wilsonii. Dating back to the Eocene, it is the only known diatom to have algal blooms found in the Horsefly Shale and Eocene Okanagan Highlands.

== See also ==
- Amnesic shellfish poisoning – Syndrome of shellfish poisoning
- Anatoxin-a
- Chironomus annularius – A species of nonbiting midges that act as a natural algae control.
- Ciguatera fish poisoning – Foodborne illness
- Dinocyst – Dormant cell type of dinoflagellates
- Dinoflagellate – Aquatic, unicellular protists with two flagella
- Domoic acid
- Emiliania huxleyi – Unicellular algae responsible for the formation of chalk
- Iron fertilization, An artificially stimulated algal bloom
- Milky seas effect – Luminous phenomenon in the ocean
- Neurotoxic shellfish poisoning – Syndrome of shellfish poisoning
- Paralytic shellfish poisoning – Syndrome of shellfish poisoning
- Pfiesteria – Genus of single-celled organisms
- Pseudi-nitzschia – Genus of marine planktonic diatoms
- Raphidophyte – Class of aquatic algae
- Saxitoxin – Paralytic shellfish toxin
- Spring bloom – Strong increase in phytoplankton abundance that typically occurs in the early spring
- Thin layers (oceanography)
- Organisms involved in water purification
