= North Atlantic Aerosols and Marine Ecosystems Study =

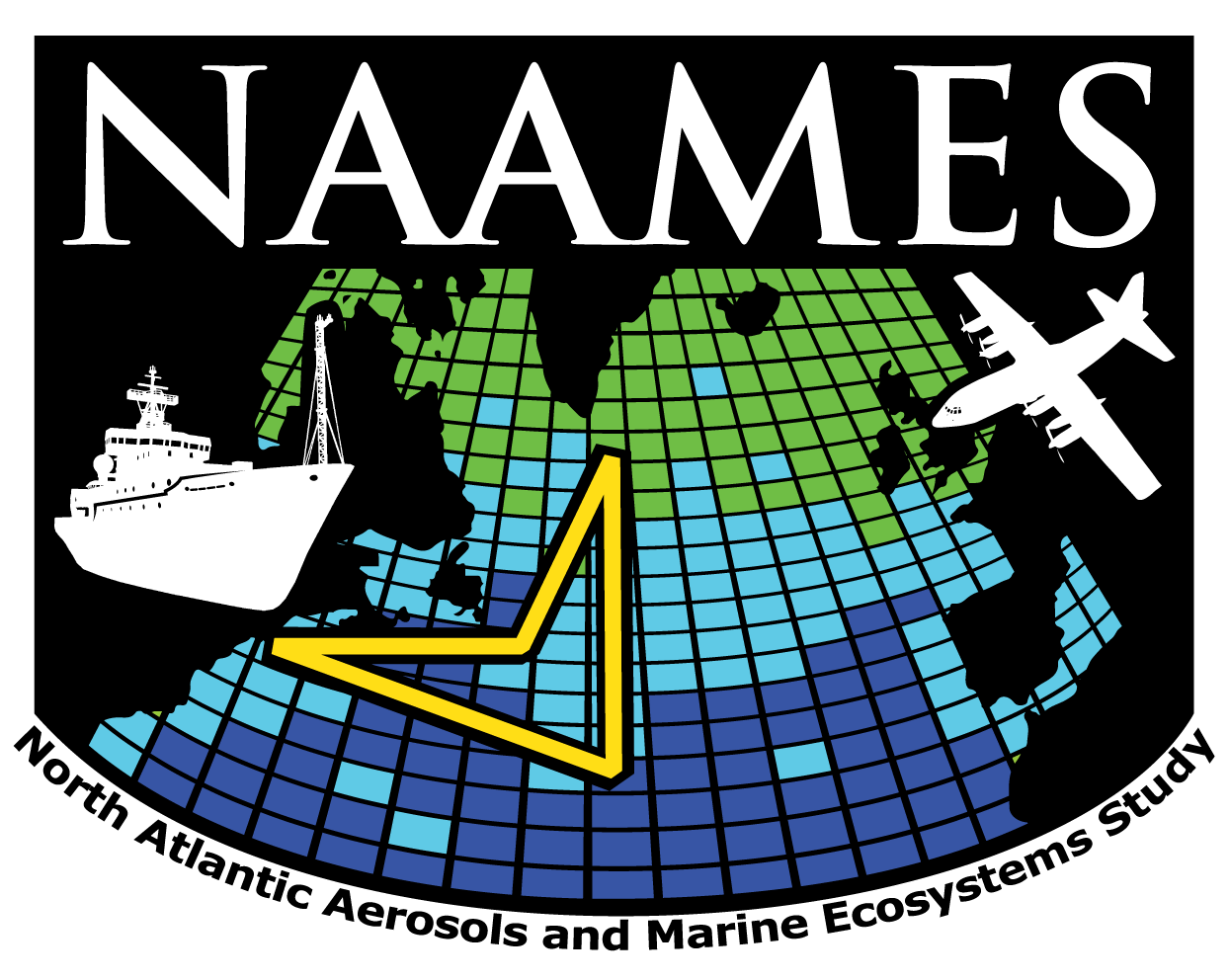
The North Atlantic Aerosols and Marine Ecosystems Study (NAAMES) project logo. Image courtesy of NASA.

The North Atlantic Aerosols and Marine Ecosystems Study (NAAMES) was a five-year scientific research program that investigated aspects of phytoplankton dynamics in ocean ecosystems, and how such dynamics influence atmospheric aerosols, clouds, and climate. The study focused on the sub-arctic region of the North Atlantic Ocean, which is the site of one of Earth's largest recurring phytoplankton blooms. The long history of research in this location, as well as relative ease of accessibility, made the North Atlantic an ideal location to test prevailing scientific hypotheses in an effort to better understand the role of phytoplankton aerosol emissions on Earth's energy budget.

NAAMES was led by scientists from Oregon State University and the National Aeronautics and Space Administration (NASA). They conducted four field campaigns from 2015-2018 that were designed to target specific phases of the annual phytoplankton cycle: minimum, climax, intermediary decreasing biomass, and increasing intermediary biomass. The campaigns were designed to observe each unique phase, in order to resolve the scientific debates on the timing of bloom formations and the patterns driving annual bloom re-creation. The NAAMES project also investigated the quantity, size, and composition of aerosols generated by primary production in order to understand how bloom cycles affect cloud formations and climate. Scientists employed multiple complementary research methods, including intensive field sampling via research ships, airborne aerosol sampling via airplane, and remote sensing via satellites.

The findings from NAAMES, while still forthcoming, have shed light on aerosols and cloud condensation nuclei, phytoplankton annual cycles, phytoplankton physiology, and mesoscale biology. Several methodological advances have also been published, including new remote sensing algorithms and advances in satellite remote sensing.

== Background ==
=== Competing hypotheses of plankton blooms ===
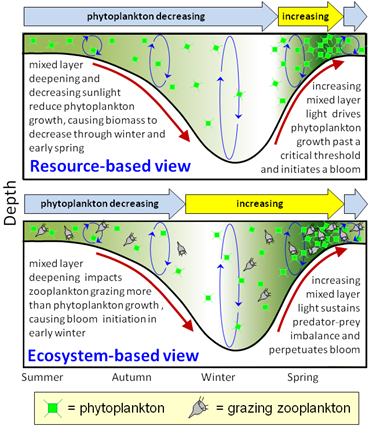
Competing scientific hypothesis of plankton variability. Figure adapted from. Courtesy of NASA.gov

NAAMES sought to better understand the impact of bioaerosol emissions on cloud dynamics and climate. It also aimed to test two competing hypotheses on plankton blooms:

==== Critical Depth Hypothesis - a resource-based view ====
The critical depth hypothesis is a resource-based view of the North Atlantic annual phytoplankton blooms. It is the traditional explanation for the cause of spring blooms and has been documented as a foundational concept in oceanography textbooks for over 50 years. It focuses on the environmental conditions necessary to initiate a bloom such as high nutrients, shallower mixing, increased light, and warmer temperatures.

The central argument for the critical depth hypothesis is that blooms are a consequence of increased phytoplankton growth rates resulting from shoaling of the mixed layer above the critical depth. The critical depth is a surface mixing depth where phytoplankton biomass growth equals phytoplankton biomass losses. In this hypothesis, losses are both constant and independent of growth. The decline in biomass may be due to grazing, sinking, dilution, vertical mixing, infection, or parasitism. When the surface mixed layer becomes shallower than the critical depth, initiation of the seasonal bloom occurs due to phytoplankton growth exceeding loss. There is a correlation of phytoplankton growth with springtime increases of light, temperature, and shallower stratification depths.

Climate warming may increase stratification or decrease mixed layer depth during the winter, which would enhance the vernal bloom or increase phytoplankton biomass if this hypothesis governed spring phytoplankton bloom dynamics. A primary criticism of this resource-based view is that spring blooms occur in the absence of stratification or shoaling of the mixed layer.

==== Dilution-recoupling Hypothesis - an ecosystem-based view ====
The dilution-recoupling hypothesis is an ecosystem-based view of the North Atlantic annual phytoplankton bloom. This hypothesis focuses on the physical processes that alter the balance between growth and grazing. The spring bloom is considered to be one feature of an annual cycle, and other features during the cycle "set the stage" for this bloom to occur.

This ecosystem-based view is based upon a dilution experiment where the addition of seawater dilutes predators but does not change the growth of phytoplankton. Thus, growth rates increase with dilution. Although the dilution effect is transient, predator-prey interactions can be maintained if the rate of the addition of water equals the rate of growth. The deepening of the surface mixed layer dilutes the predator-prey interactions and decouples growth and grazing. When the mixed layer stops deepening, the increase in growth rate becomes apparent, but now growth and grazing become coupled again. The shoaling of the mixed layer concentrates predators, thereby increasing grazing pressure. However, the increase in light availability counters grazing pressure, which allows growth rates to remain high. In late spring, when the mixed layer is even more shallow, nutrient depletion or overgrazing ends the bloom—losses exceed growth at this point in the cycle.

Climate warming would increase stratification and suppress winter mixing that occurs with the deepening of the mixed layer. The suppression of winter mixing would decrease phytoplankton biomass under this hypothesis.

=== Physical oceanographic processes ===
==== Mixed Layer Depth Debate ====
Meso-scale Eddies

Mesoscale eddies play a significant role in modulating the Mixed Layer Depth (MLD). Fluctuations created by mesoscale eddies modulate nutrients in the base of the mixed layer. These modulations, along with light availability, drive the abundance of phytoplankton in the region. The availability of phytoplankton significantly affects the marine food web and ocean health.

The fast-moving currents in the Gulf Stream meander and pinch-off to create eddies. These eddies retain the physical properties of their parent water mass (e.g. temperature, density, salinity, and other ocean dynamic properties) when they separate. As the eddies migrate, their physical properties change as they mix with the surrounding water. In the Gulf Stream, migrating eddies are known as anticyclonic or cyclonic eddies based on the direction in which they spin (clockwise vs. counter-clockwise). The two eddies differ in motion, physical properties, and, consequently, their effects on biology and chemistry of the ocean.

The Coriolis force combined with high velocity currents drive eddy motion. This motion creates a 'bulge,' i.e., high sea surface height (SSH) in the center of the Anticyclonic eddies. In contrast, cyclonic eddies exhibit a low SSH in the center. The SSH in both anticyclonic and cyclonic decreases and increases, respectively, as the distance from the center increases. Upwelling and downwelling processes in the eddies create a cold and warm core. Downwelling in the anticyclonic eddy prevents colder water from entering the surface, thus creating a warm-core in the center. Whereas in the cyclonic eddy, the upwelling entrains deep cold water and forms a cold-core.

Previous studies show the deepening effects of MLD under anticyclonic eddies and shoaling of MLD in cyclonic eddies. These phenomena may be due to increased heat loss to the atmosphere in anticyclonic eddies. This loss of heat causes the sinking of dense water, referred to as convective mixing, and the deepening of the MLD. In contrast, in cyclonic eddies the water temperature at the core is less cold than the Anticyclonic eddy. This therefore does not lead to deepening of the MLD. Studies conducted in the region via a network of Argo floats and model simulations created through satellite data have shown cases of the opposite phenomena. The deepening and shoaling of MLD via eddies is ubiquitous and varies seasonally. Such anomalies are most significant in the winter. Thus, the role of meso-scale eddies in MLD is complex, and a function of simultaneous processes where enhanced wind shear induced currents contribute to a shallowing of the MLD in anticyclonic eddies.

=== Relevant Atmospheric Processes ===
==== Marine Boundary Layer ====
The marine boundary layer (MBL) is the part of the atmosphere in direct contact with the ocean surface. The MBL is influenced by the exchange of heat, moisture, gases, particulates, and momentum, primarily via turbulence. The MBL is characterized by the formation of convective cells (or vertical flow of air) above the ocean surface, which perturbs the direction of the mean surface wind and generates texture, roughness, and waves on the sea's surface. Two types of boundary layers exist. One is a stable, convective layer found between the lower 100m of the atmosphere extending up to approximately 3 km in height, and is referred to as the convective boundary layer (CBL). The other boundary layer forms as a result of a surface atmospheric inversion. This generally occurs closer to the surface in the absence of turbulence and vertical mixing, and is determined through the interpretation of vertical humidity and temperature profiles. The MBL is often a localized and temporally dynamic phenomenon, and therefore its height into the air column can vary considerably from one region to another, or even across the span of a few days. The North Atlantic is a region where diverse and well-formed MBL clouds are commonly formed, and where MBL layer height can be between 2.0-and 0.1 km in height

==== Regional Atmospheric Processes ====
The westerlies are prevailing winds in the middle latitudes (between 35 and 65 degrees latitude), which blow in regions north or southward of the high-pressure sub-tropical regions of the world. Consequently, aerosols sampled over the North Atlantic Ocean will be influenced by air masses originating in North America, and therefore be characterized by both the natural terrestrial and anthropogenic inputs. Relevant to NAAMES are the emissions from industry and urban environments in eastern North America, which emit substantial quantities of sulfates, black carbon, and aromatic compounds. Such substances can be transported hundreds of kilometers over the sea. This contribution of continental influences may create a false positive signal in the biological fluorescence signals being measured and could affect cloud microphysical properties in the open North Atlantic Ocean. Furthermore, aerosols such as black carbon mixed with carbon dioxide and other greenhouse gases are emitted through the impartial combustion of fossil fuels from ship engines. These unburned hydrocarbons are present in the marine boundary layer of the North Atlantic and most other remote oceanic regions. As these particles age or are chemically transformed as a function of time in the air, they may alter microphysical and chemical properties as they react with other airborne particles.

=== Role of aerosols ===
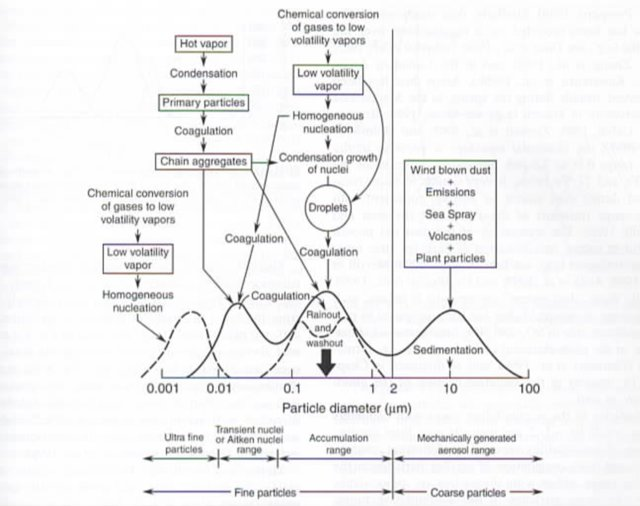
Aerosol size distribution and their associated modes of accumulation or removal from the atmosphere. Original diagram by, and adapted by.

==== Aerosols ====
Aerosols are very small, solid particles or liquid droplets suspended in the atmosphere or inside another gas and are formed through natural processes or by human actions. Natural aerosols include volcanic ash, biological particles, and mineral dust, as well as black carbon from the natural combustion of biomass, such as wildfires. Anthropogenic aerosols are those that have been emitted from human actions, such as fossil fuel burning or industrial emissions. Aerosols are classified as either primary or secondary depending on whether they have been directly emitted into the atmosphere (primary) or whether they have reacted and changed in composition (secondary) after being emitted from their source. Aerosols emitted from the marine environment are one of the largest components of primary natural aerosols. Marine primary aerosols interact with anthropogenic pollution, and through these reactions produce other secondary aerosols.

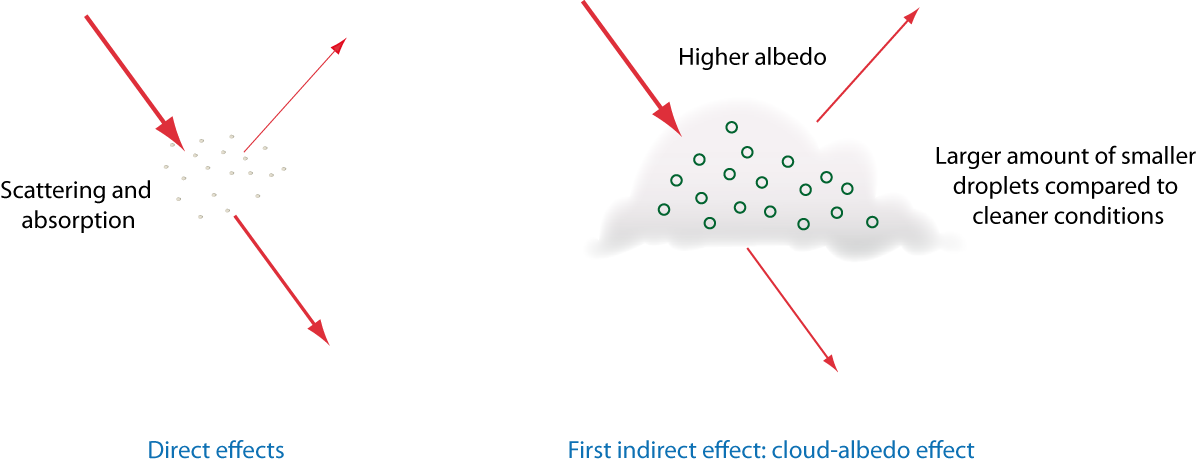
Representation of the direct and first indirect effect of aerosols on the albedo of clouds and therefore Earth's radiative balance.

One of the most significant yet uncertain components of predictive climate change models is the impact of aerosols on the climate system. Aerosols affect Earth's radiation balance directly and indirectly. The direct effect occurs when aerosol particles scatter, absorb, or exhibit a combination of these two optical properties when interacting with incoming solar and infrared radiation in the atmosphere. Aerosols that typically scatter light include sulfates, nitrates, and some organic particles, while those that tend to exhibit a net absorption include mineral dust and black carbon (or soot). The second mechanism by which aerosols alter the planet's temperature is called the indirect effect, which occurs when a cloud's microphysical properties are altered causing either an increase in reflection of incoming solar radiation, or an inhibited ability of clouds to develop precipitation. The first indirect effect is an increase in the amount of water droplets, which leads to an increase in clouds that reflect more solar radiation and therefore cool the planet's surface. The second indirect effect (also called the cloud's lifetime effect) is the increase in droplet numbers, which simultaneously causes an increase in droplet size, and therefore less potential for precipitation. That is, smaller droplets mean clouds live longer and retain higher liquid water content, which is associated with lower precipitation rates and higher cloud albedo. This highlights the importance of aerosol size as one of the primary determinants of aerosol quantity in the atmosphere, how aerosols are removed from the atmosphere, and the implications of these processes in climate. Fine particles are generally those below 2 micrometers (μm) in diameter. Within this category, the range of particles that accumulate in the atmosphere (due to low volatility or condensation growth of nuclei) are from 0.1-1 μm, and are usually removed from the air through wet deposition. Wet deposition can be precipitation, snow or hail. On the other hand, coarse particles, such as old sea-spray and plant-derived particles, are removed from the atmosphere via dry deposition. This process is sometimes also called sedimentation. However, different types of biogenic organic aerosols exhibit different microphysical properties, and therefore their removal mechanisms from the air will depend on humidity. Without a better understanding of aerosol sizes and composition in the North Atlantic Ocean, climate models have limited ability to predict the magnitude of the cooling effect of aerosols in global climate.

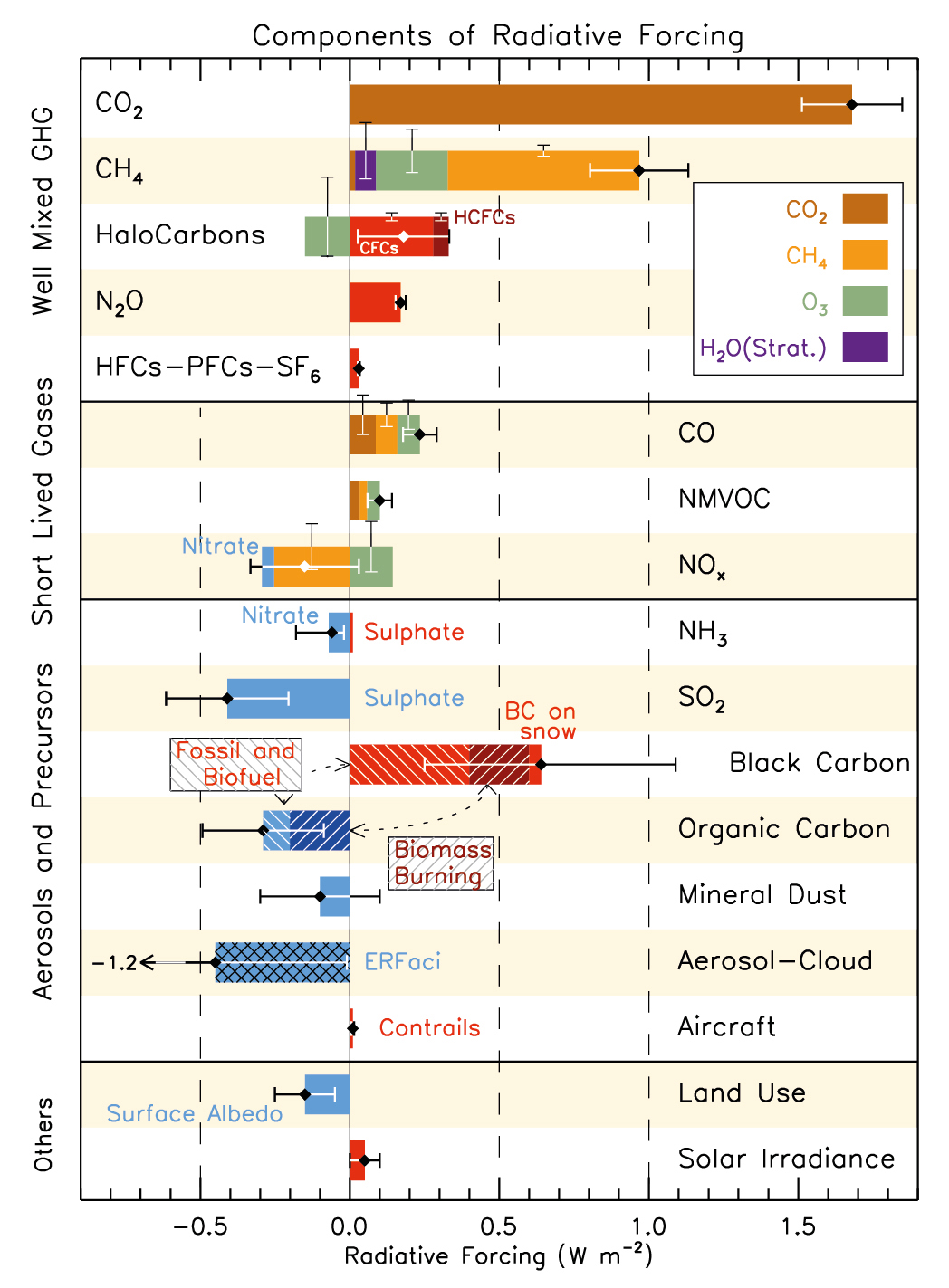
Contribution of aerosols and gases in the atmosphere of to the Earth's radiative forcing. This is Figure 8.17 of Working Group 1 Firth Assessment (AR5) report by the Intergovernmental Panel on Climate Change (IPCC) Note the net cooling effect of sulphates.

==== Sea-spray Aerosols ====
Although the amount and composition of aerosol particles in the marine atmosphere originate both from continental and oceanic sources and can be transported great distances, freshly emitted sea-spray aerosols (SSA) constitute one of the major sources of primary aerosols, especially from moderate and strong winds. The estimated global emission of pure sea-salt aerosols are on the order of 2,000-10,000 Tg per year. The mechanism by which this occurs starts with the generation of air bubbles in breaking waves, which then rise to the atmosphere and burst into hundreds of ultra-fine droplets ranging from 0.1-1.0 μm in diameter. Sea-spray aerosols are mostly composed of inorganic salts, such as sodium and chloride. However, these bubbles sometimes carry organic material found in seawater, forming secondary organic compounds (SOAs) such as dimethyl sulfide (DMS). This compound plays a key role in the NAAMES project.

An important biogeochemical consequence of SSA are their role as cloud condensation nuclei. These are particles that provide the surfaces necessary for water vapor to condensate below supersaturation conditions. The freezing of organic matter in these aerosols promotes the formation of clouds in warmer and drier environments than where they would otherwise form, especially at high latitudes such as the North Atlantic Ocean. Organic matter in these aerosols help nucleation of water droplets at these regions, yet plenty of unknowns remain, such as what fraction contain ice-freezing organic materials, and from what biological sources. Nevertheless, the role of phytoplankton blooms as a source of enhanced ice nucleating particles has been confirmed in laboratory experiments, implying the important role of these aerosols in cloud radiative forcing. Primary marine aerosols created through bubble-bursting emission have been measured in the North Atlantic during spring 2008 by the International Chemistry Experiment in the Arctic Lower Troposphere (ICEALOT). This research cruise measured clean, or background, areas and found them to be mostly composed of primary marine aerosols containing hydroxyl (58% ±13) and alkene (21% ±9) functional groups, indicating the importance of chemical compounds in the air with biological origin. Nonetheless, the small temporal scale of these measurements, plus the inability to determine the exact source of these particles, justifies the scientific need for a better understanding of aerosols over this region.

==== Bioaerosols ====
Bioaerosols are particles composed of living and non-living components released from terrestrial and marine ecosystems into the atmosphere. These can be forest, grasslands, agricultural crops, or even marine primary producers, such as phytoplankton. Primary biological aerosol particles (PBAPs) contain a range of biologic materials, including bacteria, archaea, algae, and fungi, and have been estimated to comprise as much as 25% of global total aerosol mass. Dispersal of these PBAPs occur via direct emission into the atmosphere through fungi spores, pollen, viruses, and biological fragments. Ambient concentrations and sizes of these particles vary by location and seasonality, but of relevance to NAAMES are the transient sizes of fungi spores (0.05 to 0.15 μm in diameter) and larger sizes (0.1 to 4 μm) for bacteria. Marine organic aerosols (OA) have been estimated through their correlation to chlorophyll pigments to vary in magnitude between 2-100 Tg per year. However, recent studies of OA are correlated with DMS production and to a lesser extent chlorophyll, suggesting that organic material in sea salt aerosols are connected to biological activity in the sea's surface. The mechanisms contributing to marine organic aerosols thus remain unclear, and were a main focus of NAAMES.

There is some evidence that marine bioaerosols containing cyanobacteria and microalgae may be harmful to human health. Phytoplankton can absorb and accumulate a variety of toxic substances, such as methylmercury, polychlorinated biphenyls (PCBs), and polycyclic aromatic hydrocarbons. Cyanobacteria are known to produce toxins that can be aerosolized, which when inhaled by humans can affect the nervous and liver systems. For example, Caller et al. (2009) suggested that bioaerosls from cyanobacteria blooms could play a role in high incidences of amyotrophic lateral sclerosis (ALS). In addition, a group of toxic compounds called microcystins are produced by some cyanobacteria in the genera Microcystis, Synechococcus, and Anabaena. These microcystins have been found in aerosols by a number of investigators, and such aerosols have been implicated as causing isolated cases of pneumonia, gastroenteritis, and non-alcoholic fatty liver disease. Dinoflagellates are also thought to be involved in bioaerosol toxicity, with the genus Ostreopsis causing symptoms such as dyspnea, fever, rhinorrhea, and cough. Importantly, marine toxic aerosols have been found as far as 4 km inland, but investigators recommend additional studies that trace the fate of bioaerosols further inland.

The fungi phylum of Ascomycota has been understood as the major contributor (72% in relative proportion to other phyla) to marine bioaerosols, at least in the Southern Ocean. Of these, Agaricomycetes constitutes the majority (95%) of fungi classes inside this phylum. Within this group, the Penicillium genus is most frequently detected in marine fungi aerosols. Fungi bioaerosols can also serve as ice nuclei, and therefore also impact the radiative budget in remote ocean regions, such as the North Atlantic Ocean.

In addition to sea-spray aerosols (see section above), biogenic aerosols produced by phytoplankton are also important source of small (typically 0.2 μm) cloud condensation nuclei (CCN) particles suspended in the atmosphere. The Intergovernmental Panel on Climate Change (IPCC), forecasted an increase in global surface ocean temperatures by +1.3 to +2.8 degrees Celsius over the next century, which will cause spatial and seasonal shifts in North Atlantic phytoplankton blooms. Changes in community dynamics will greatly affect the bioaerosols available for cloud condensation nuclei. Therefore, cloud formation in the North Atlantic is sensitive to bioaerosol availability, particle size, and chemical composition.

=== Marine Bioaerosols and Global Radiation Balance ===
Marine aerosols contribute significantly to global aerosols. Traditionally, biogeochemical cycling and climate modeling have focused on sea-salt aerosols, with less attention on biogenically-derived aerosol particles such as sulfates and related chemical species emitted from phytoplankton. For example, in the eastern North Atlantic during the spring 2002 bloom, high phytoplankton activity was marked more by organic carbon (both soluble and insoluble species) than by sea-salts. The organic fraction from phytoplankton contributed as much as 63% of the aerosol mass in the atmosphere, while during winter periods of low biological activity it only accounted for 15% of the aerosol mass. Those data provided early empirical evidence of this emission phenomena, while also showing that organic matter from ocean biota can enhance cloud droplet concentrations by as much as 100%.

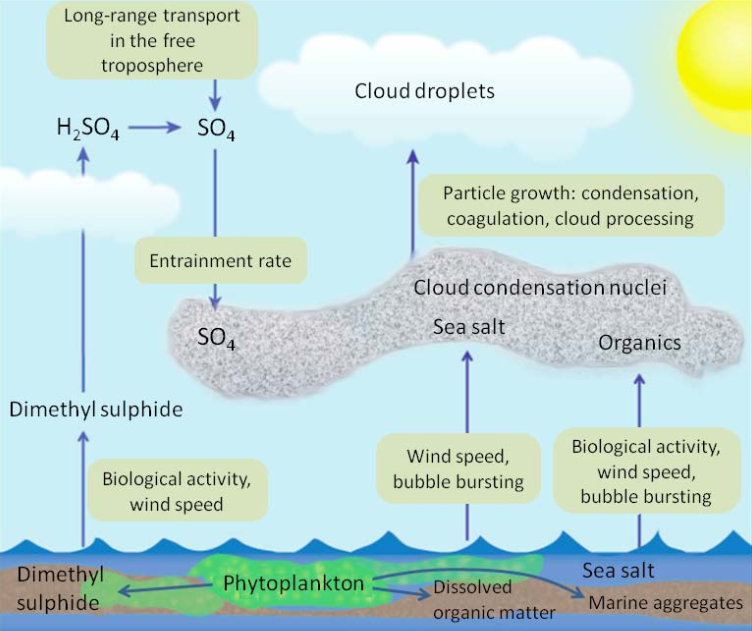
Phytoplankton booms are important sources for biogenic aerosols that provide cloud condensation nuclei

==== Data to test the CLAW Hypothesis ====
There is growing evidence describing how oceanic phytoplankton affect cloud albedo and climate through the biogeochemical cycle of sulfur, as originally proposed in the late 1980s. The CLAW hypothesis conceptualizes and tries to quantify the mechanisms by which phytoplankton can alter global cloud cover and provide planetary-scale radiation balance or homeostasis regulation. As solar irradiance drives primary production in the upper layers of the ocean, aerosols are released into the planetary boundary layer. A percentage of these aerosols are assimilated into clouds, which then can generate a negative feedback loop by reflecting solar radiation. The ecosystem-based hypothesis of phytoplankton bloom cycles (explored by NAAMES) suggests that a warming ocean would lead to a decrease in phytoplankton productivity. Decreased phytoplankton would cause a decrease in aerosol availability, which may lead to fewer clouds. This would result in a positive feedback loop, where warmer oceans lead to fewer clouds, which allows for more warming.

One of the key components of the CLAW hypothesis is the emission of dimethylsulfoniopropionate (DMSP) by phytoplankton. Another chemical compound, dimethyl sulfide (DMS), has been identified as a major volatile sulfur compound in most oceans. DMS concentrations in the world's seawater have been estimated to be, on average, on the order of 102.4 nanograms per liter (ng/L). Regional values of the North Atlantic are roughly 66.8 ng/L. These regional values vary seasonally and are influenced by the effects of continental aerosols. Nonetheless, DMS is one of the dominant sources of biogenic volatile sulfur compounds in the marine atmosphere. Since its conceptualization, several research studies have found empirical and circumstantial evidence supporting the CLAW hypothesis in mid-latitudes of the Atlantic Ocean. The NAAMES campaign sought to provide an empirical understanding of the effects of marine bioaerosols on cloud formation and global radiation balance by quantifying the mechanisms underlying the CLAW hypothesis.

==== Emissions from the sea surface micro-layer ====
Dissolved organic compounds containing remnants of polysaccharides, proteins, lipids, and other biological components are released by phytoplankton and bacteria. They are concentrated into nano-sized gels on the surface of the oceans. Specifically, such compounds are concentrated in the sea surface micro-layer (SML), the uppermost film of water in the ocean. The SML is considered a "skin" within the top 1 millimeter of water where the exchange of matter and energy occurs between the sea and atmosphere. The biological, chemical, and physical processes occurring here may be some of the most important anywhere on Earth, and this thin layer experiences the first exposure to climatic changes such as heat, trace gases, winds, precipitation, and also wastes such as nanomaterials and plastics. The SML also has important roles in air-sea gas exchange and the production of primary organic aerosols.

A study using water samples and ambient conditions from the North Atlantic Ocean found that a polysaccharide-containing exopolymer and a protein are easily aerosolized in surface ocean waters, and scientists were able to quantify the amount and size resolution of the primary sea to air transport of biogenic material. These materials are small enough (0.2μm) to be largely emitted from phytoplankton and other microorganisms. However, predicting aerosol quantity, size distribution, and composition through water samples are currently problematic. Investigators suggest that future measurements focus on comparing fluorescence detection techniques that are able to detect proteins in aerosols. NAAMES filled this research gap by providing a fluorescent-based instrument (See section on Atmospheric Instruments below), both in the air column and near the sea's surface.

=== NAAMES Objectives ===
- Identify the different features of the annual cycle of phytoplankton blooms in the North Atlantic and determine the different physical processes affecting those features.

To accomplish this objective, a combination of ship-based, airborne, and remote sensing measurements was used. NAAMES conducted multiple campaigns that occurred during the various phases of the cycle in order to capture the important transitory features of the annual bloom for a comprehensive view.

- Understand how the different features of the North Atlantic annual phytoplankton cycle interact to "set the stage" for annual blooms.

This objective seeks to reconcile the competing resource-based and ecosystem-based hypotheses. NAAMES goal was to provide the mechanistic field studies necessary to understand a more holistic view of the annual bloom cycle.

- Determine how the different features of the annual phytoplankton cycle affect marine aerosols and cloud formation.

The effects of aerosols on clouds is an understudied topic despite the major implications it could have for predicting future climate change. This objective addressed this gap by using combined measurement methods to understand the contribution of various aerosols to cloud formation produced during each major phase of the annual phytoplankton cycle.

== Methodology ==
=== Field Campaigns ===
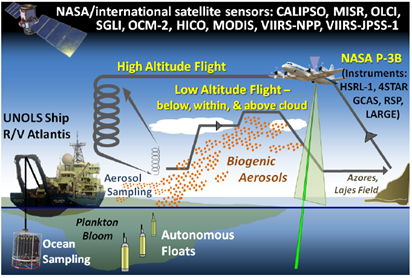
Schematic of the diverse sampling strategies for NAAMES research campaigns, including satellite sensors, vessel measurements and deployments and aircraft remote sensing. It also depicts key processes, such as phytoplankton booms and aerosol emission and dispersion.

Four field campaigns were conducted to target the four specific changes during the annual plankton cycle. The four NAAMES field campaigns synchronized data collections from the ship, air, and satellites, and were strategically timed to capture the four unique phases of plankton blooms in the North Atlantic: winter transition, accumulation phase, climax transition, and depletion phase.

- Campaign 1: Winter Transition sampling completed November 5-December 2, 2015
- Campaign 2: Climax Transition sampling completed May 11-June 5, 2016
- Campaign 3: Declining Phase sampling completed August 30-September 24, 2017
- Campaign 4: Accumulation Phase sampling completed March 20-April 13, 2018

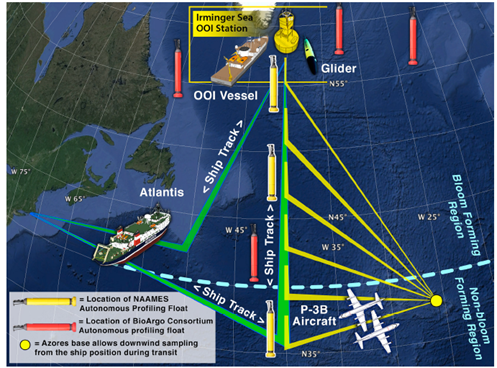
Area of study for NAAMES depicting routes of research vessels and deployment of autonomous profiling floats. Image courtesy of NASA.

=== Sampling ===
==== Research cruises on the R/V Atlantis ====
Ship-based instruments measured gases, particles, and volatile organic compounds above the ocean surface. Water samples were also collected to describe the plankton community composition, rates of productivity and respiration, and physiologic stress.

All four campaigns followed a similar ship and flight plan. The R/V Atlantis departed from Woods Hole, Massachusetts, to embark on 26-day cruises covering 4700 nautical miles. The ship first sailed to 40^{$\circ$}W. It then moved due north from 40^{$\circ$}N to 55^{$\circ$}N latitude along the 40^{$\circ$}W longitude parallel. This intensive south-north transect involved multiple stationary measurements. The ship then returned to port in Woods Hole.

Underway sampling (i.e., while the ship was moving) occurred along the entire cruise using the ship's flow-through seawater analysis system. Then, once it reached the beginning of the triangular transect area, the ship stopped twice a day at dawn and noon for stationary measurements to collect water samples for incubation (e.g. respiration), and perform water-column sampling and optical measurements.

Scientists also used autonomous ARGO floats at three locations during each cruise. These autonomous floating instruments measured parameters such as chlorophyll (a measure of phytoplankton abundance), light intensity, temperature, water density, and suspended particulates. A total of 12 autonomous instruments were deployed during the four cruises.

==== Airborne sampling ====
Airplane-based measurements were designed to run at precisely the same time as the research vessel cruises so that scientists could link ocean-level processes with those in the lower atmosphere. Satellite data were also synthesized to create a more complete understanding of plankton and aerosol dynamics, and their potential impact on climate and ecosystems.

Airborne sampling involved a C-130 equipped with sensitive scientific instruments. The flight crew based at St. John's, Canada, conducted 10-hour flights in a "Z-pattern" above the study area. Flights took place at both high-altitudes and low-altitudes to measure aerosol heights and aerosol/ecosystem spatial features. High-altitude flights collected data on above-cloud aerosols and atmospheric measurements of background aerosols in the troposphere. Once above the ship, the airplane underwent spiral descents to low-altitude to acquire data on the vertical structure of aerosols. These low-altitude flights sampled aerosols within the marine boundary layer. Cloud sampling measured in-cloud droplet number, density, and size measurements.

==== Satellite Observations ====
Satellite measurements were used in near real-time to help guide ship movement and flight planning. Measurements included sea surface height, sea surface temperature, ocean color, winds, and clouds. Satellite data also provided mean surface chlorophyll concentrations via NASA's Moderate Resolution Imaging Spectroradiometer (MODIS), as a proxy for primary productivity.

==== Autonomous ARGO Floats ====
Autonomous in-situ instruments called Argo floats were deployed to collect physical properties and bio-optical measurements. Argo floats are a battery-powered instrument that uses hydraulics to control its buoyancy to descend-and-ascend in the water. The Argo floats collect both the biological and physical properties of the ocean. The data collected from the floats are transmitted remotely via the ARGOS satellite.

==== Atmospheric Instruments ====
Instruments used to characterize processes in the atmosphere can be divided into those that measure gas composition, and those that measure the composition of optical properties. Generally, aerosol sampling instruments are categorized by their ability to measure optical, physical, or chemical properties. Physical properties include parameters such as the particle diameter and shape.

Two commonly measured optical parameters are absorption and scattering of light by aerosol particles. The absorption and scattering coefficients depend on aerosol quantity.

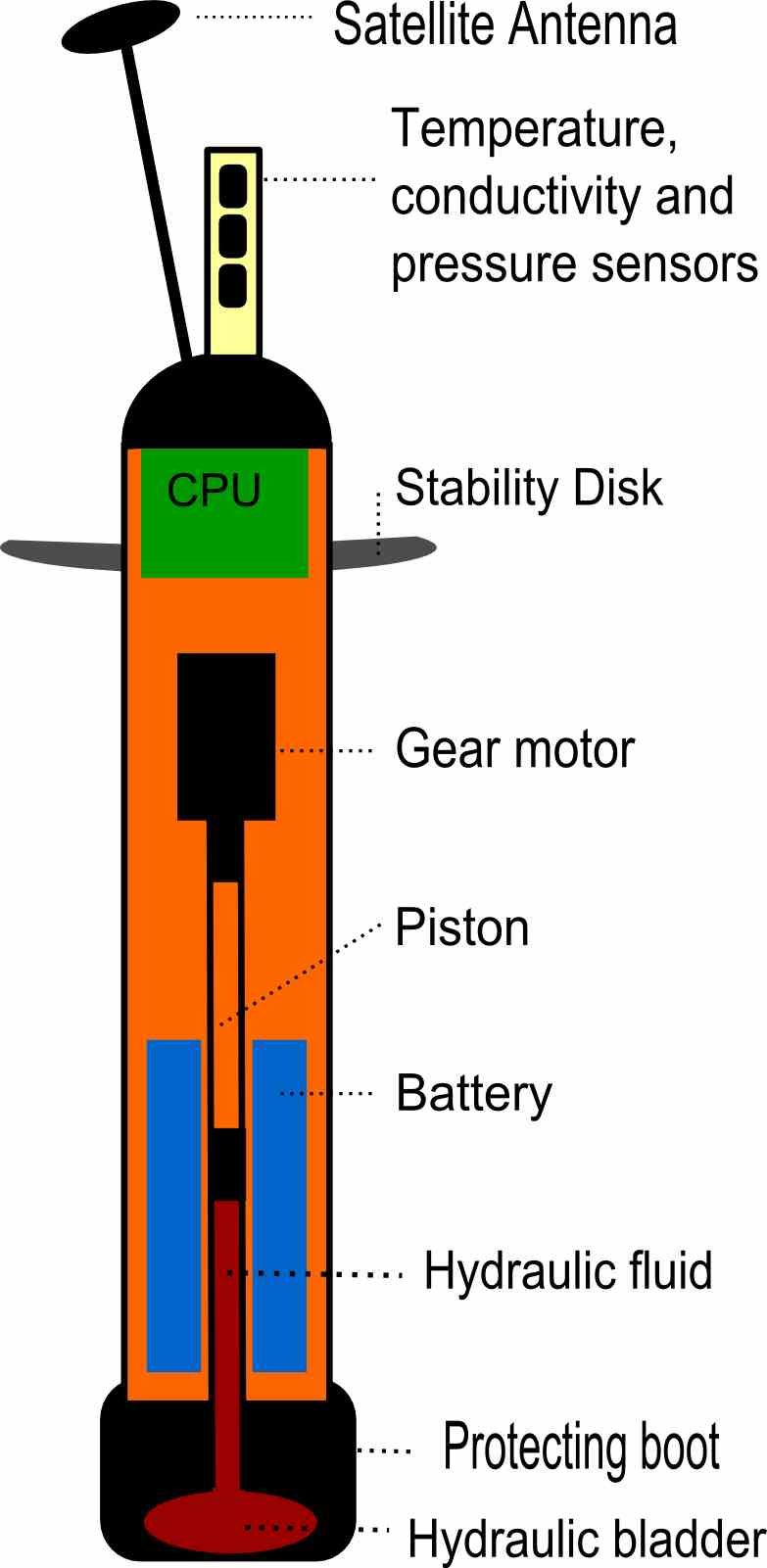
The Autonomous ARGOS floats collects Conductivity, Temperature, and Depth (CTD) measurements. It adjusts its hydraulics to ascend and descend in the water.

Total light scattering by aerosol particles can be measured with a nephelometer. In contrast, aerosol light absorption can be measured using several types of instruments, such as the Particle Soot/Absorption Photometer (PSAP) and the Continuous Light Absorption Photometer (CLAP). In both of these instruments, particles are collected on a filter and light transmission through the filter is monitored continuously. This method is based on the integrating plate technique, in which the change in optical transmission of a filter caused by particle deposition is related to the light absorption coefficient of the deposited particles using Beer-Lambert's Law.

One of the instruments used to characterize the amount and composition of bioaerosols was the Wideband Integrated Bioaerosol Sensors (WIBS). This instrument uses ultraviolet light-induced fluorescence (UV-LIF) to detect the fluorescence signals from common amino acids like tryptophan and nicotinamide adenine dinucleotide (NADH). A lamp flashing the gas xenon is able to detect particle's size and shape using high precision ultraviolet wavebands (280 nm and 370 nm).

== Scientific Findings ==
=== Results ===
Some results stemming from NAAMES research include scientific articles on aerosols and cloud condensation nuclei, phytoplankton annual cycles, phytoplankton physiology, and mesoscale biology. There have also been publications on improved methodologies including new remote sensing algorithms and advances in satellite remote sensing.

==== Phytoplankton annual cycles ====
Seasonal changes in phytoplankton biomass are controlled by predator-prey interactions and changes in mixed layer conditions such as temperature, light, and nutrients. Understanding the relative importance of these various factors at different stages of the seasonal cycle allows for better predictions of future ocean changes. One publication from NAAMES found the winter mixed layer depth to be positively correlated with spring chlorophyll concentrations in the Labrador Sea. Losses through sinking during the winter were compensated by net growth of phytoplankton, and this net wintertime growth was most likely a function of reduced grazing due to dilution.

==== Phytoplankton physiology ====
Understanding taxonomic differences in photoacclimation and general phytoplankton community photoacclimation strategies is important for constructing models that rely on light as a major factor controlling bloom dynamics. Furthermore, a better understanding of phytoplankton light-driven physiology can assist with better readings of satellite data on chlorophyll concentrations and sea surface temperature. A NAAMES study determined the photoacclimation responses of multiple taxonomic groups during a 4-day storm event that caused deep mixing and re-stratification in the subarctic Atlantic ocean. There were significant differences in photoacclimation and biomass accumulation at various depths of light intensity during the storm event.

==== Mesoscale biology ====
One of the most recent results of the NAAMES campaign includes a better understanding of how biology helps draw atmospheric carbon dioxide down into the water column. Specifically, the impact of zooplankton vertical migration on carbon export to the deep sea via the Biological Pump was parametrized and modeled for the first time.

==== Aerosols and cloud condensation nuclei ====
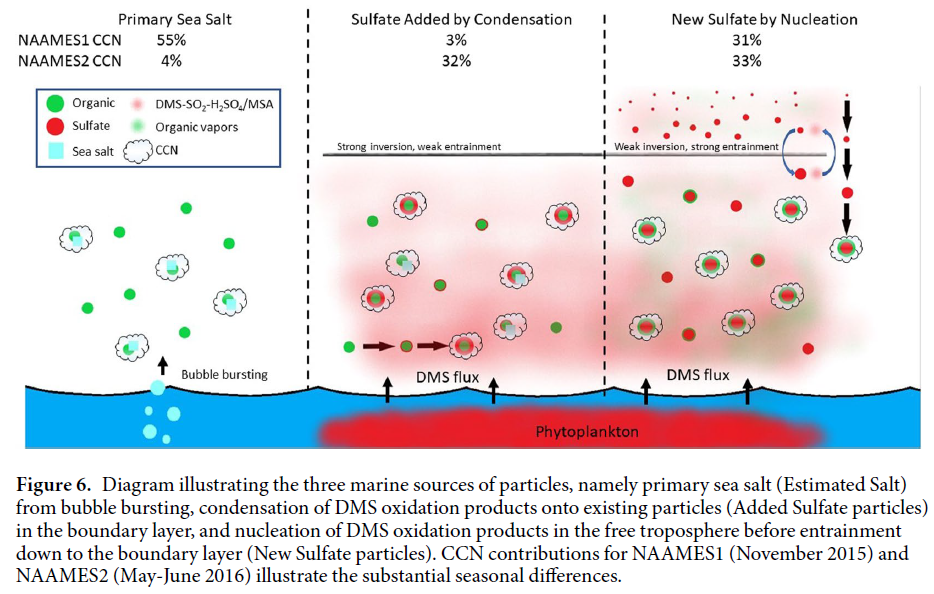
Illustration of sources of aerosols found during NAAMES cruises

A clear seasonal difference in the quantity of biogenic sulfate aerosols was discovered in the North Atlantic as a result of the NAAMES campaign. These aerosols were traced to two different biogenic origins, both of them marine due to the lack of continental air mass influences during the study period. The biogenic origin was the production of dimethyl sulfide (DMS) by phytoplankton, which then act as cloud condensation nuclei (CCN) and affect cloud formation. This study classified the sulfates as "New Sulfate", formed by nucleation in the atmosphere; and "Added Sulfate", which were existing aerosols in the atmosphere where sulfate was incorporated. During the November 2015 cruise (Campaign 1), primary sea salt was the main mechanism (55%) for CCN budget. However, during the spring bloom in May–June 2016 (Campaign 2) Added Sulfate accounted for 32% of CCN while sea-salt accounted for 4%. These empirical measurements by seasonality will help improve the accuracy of climate models that simulate warming or cooling effects of marine bioaerosols.

==== Improved measurement methodologies ====
NAAMES scientists developed several novel measurement techniques during the project. For example, sorting flow cytometry combined with bioluminescent detection of ATP and NADH provides relatively precise determination of phytoplankton net primary productivity, growth rate, and biomass. Both laboratory and field tests validated this approach, which does not require traditional carbon-14 isotope incubation techniques. Other NAAMES investigators employed new techniques to measure particle size distribution, which is an important metric of biogeochemistry and ecosystem dynamics. By coupling a submersible laser diffraction particle sizer with a continuously flowing seawater system, scientists were able to accurately measure particle size distribution just as well as more established (but more time- and effort-intensive) methods such as Coulter counter and flow-cytobot. In addition to new oceanographic techniques, the NAAMES team also developed a novel method of collecting cloud water. An aircraft-mounted probe used inertial separation to collect cloud droplets from the atmosphere. Their axial cyclone technique was reported to collect cloud water at a rate of 4.5 ml per minute, which was stored and later analyzed in the lab.

==== New remote sensing algorithms ====
Advances in remote sensing algorithms were also developed during the NAAMES expeditions. Zhang et al. provided atmospheric corrections for the hyperspectral geostationary coastal and air pollution events airborne simulator (GCAS) instrument using both vicarious and cloud shadow approaches. Other scientists tested new approaches to measuring cloud droplet size, and found that using a research scanning polarimeter correlated well with direct cloud droplet probe measurements and high-spectral resolution LIDAR. Their findings suggest that polarimetric droplet size retrieval may be an accurate and useful tool to measure global cloud droplet size.

==== Advances in satellite LIDAR ocean remote sensing ====
The NAAMES team made advances in the use of LIDAR in oceanography. For example, Behrenfeld et al. (2017) showed that space-based LIDAR could capture annual cycles of phytoplankton dynamics in regions poleward of 45^{$\circ$} latitude. Using these new techniques, they found that Antarctic phytoplankton biomass mainly changes due to ice cover, while in the arctic the changes in phytoplankton are driven mainly by ecological processes. In another paper, the team described new advances in satellite LIDAR techniques, and argued that a new era of space-based LIDAR has the potential to revolutionize oceanographic remote sensing.

==== Future Implications ====
NAAMES provided groundbreaking data on aerosols and their relationship to numerous ecosystems and oceanographic parameters. Their discoveries and methodologic innovations can be employed by modelers to determine how future oceanic ecosystem changes could affect climate.

=== NAAMES Data ===
Finalized versions of field data can be viewed through NASA's Distributed Active Archive Centers (DAACs). Data for each cruise campaign were stored as separate projects and each campaign's information was publicly released within 1 year of measurement collection. Ship-based information can be viewed through the SeaWiFS Bio-optical Archive and Storage System (SeaBASS) while airborne information can be viewed through the Atmospheric Science Data Center (ASDC).

NAAMES anticipates many additional publications to be released in the coming years from ongoing research and processing of data.

== See also ==
- CLAW hypothesis
- GAIA hypothesis
- Biological pump
- Ocean color remote sensing
- Oceanic carbon cycle
- Algal blooms
- Effects of climate change on oceans
- Bioaerosol
- Submesoscale and mesoscale Ekman Pumping, Dr. Dudley Chelton seminar
- Eddies in the Ocean
