= Phytoplankton =

Autotrophic members of the plankton ecosystem

Phytoplankton (/ˌfaɪtoʊˈplæŋktən/) are the autotrophic (self-feeding) components of the plankton community and a key part of ocean and freshwater ecosystems. The name comes from Ancient Greek φυτόν (phutón), meaning "plant", and πλαγκτός (planktós), meaning "drifter, wanderer, roamer", and thus, "plant drifter".

Phytoplankton obtain their energy through photosynthesis, as trees and other plants do on land. This means phytoplankton must receive sunlight, so they live in the well-lit surface layers (euphotic zone) of oceans and lakes. Compared with terrestrial plants, phytoplankton are distributed over a larger surface area, experience less seasonal variation, and have markedly faster turnover rates (days versus decades). As a result, phytoplankton respond rapidly on a global scale to climate variations.

Phytoplankton form the base of marine and freshwater food webs and are key players in the global carbon cycle. They account for about half of global photosynthetic activity and at least half of the oxygen production, despite amounting to only about 1% of the global plant biomass.

Phytoplankton are very diverse, comprising photosynthesizing bacteria (cyanobacteria) and various unicellular protist groups (notably the diatoms).

Most phytoplankton are too small to be individually seen with the unaided eye. However, when present in sufficient numbers, some varieties may appear as colored patches on the water surface due to chlorophyll in their cells and, in some species, accessory pigments (such as phycobiliproteins or xanthophylls).

== Types ==
Phytoplankton are photosynthesizing microscopic protists and bacteria that inhabit the upper sunlit layer of marine and freshwater bodies of water on Earth. Paralleling plants on land, phytoplankton undertake primary production in water, creating organic compounds from carbon dioxide dissolved in the water. Phytoplankton form the base of — and sustain — the aquatic food web, and are crucial players in the Earth's carbon cycle.

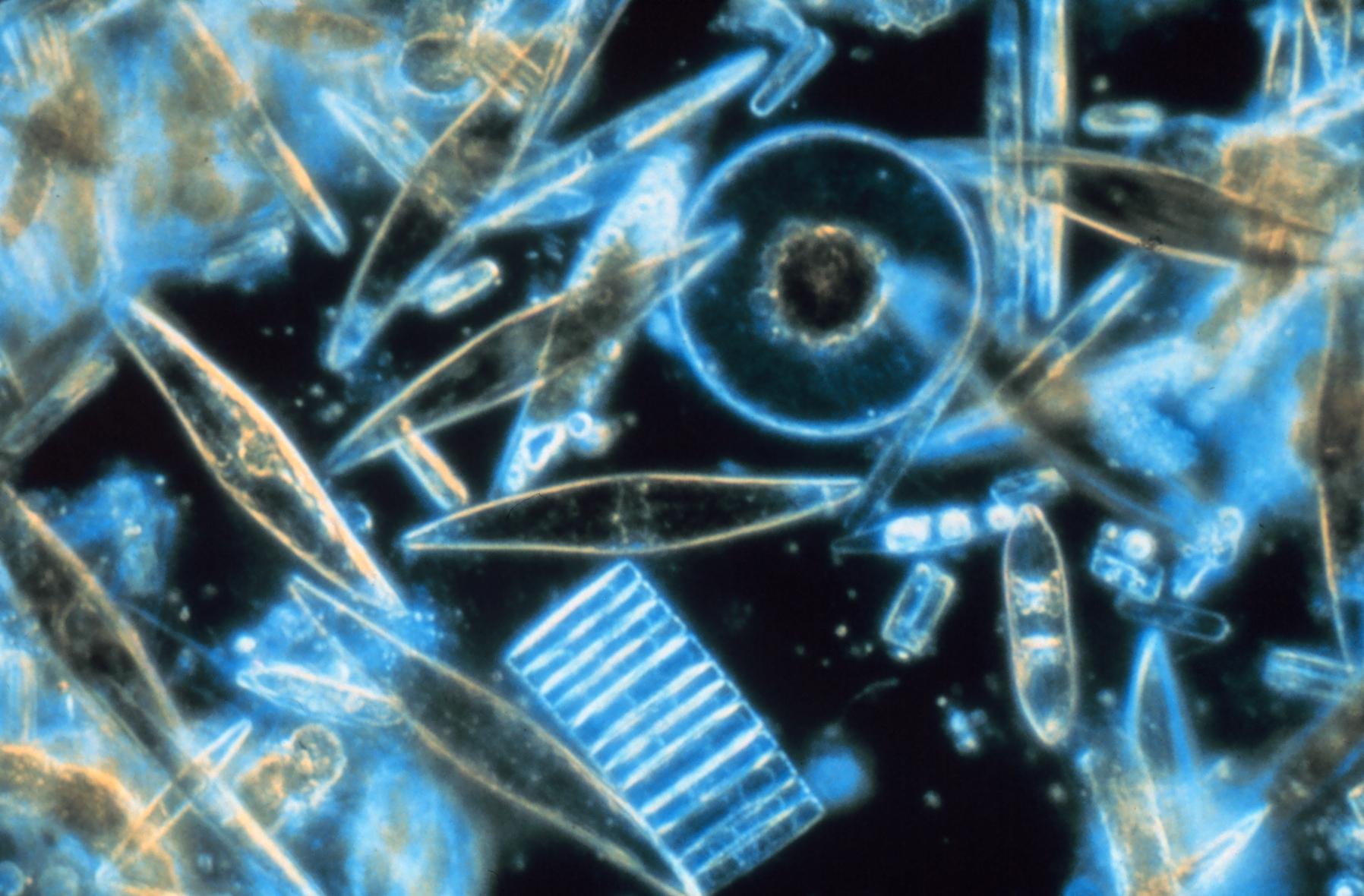
Diatoms are one of the most common types
of phytoplankton

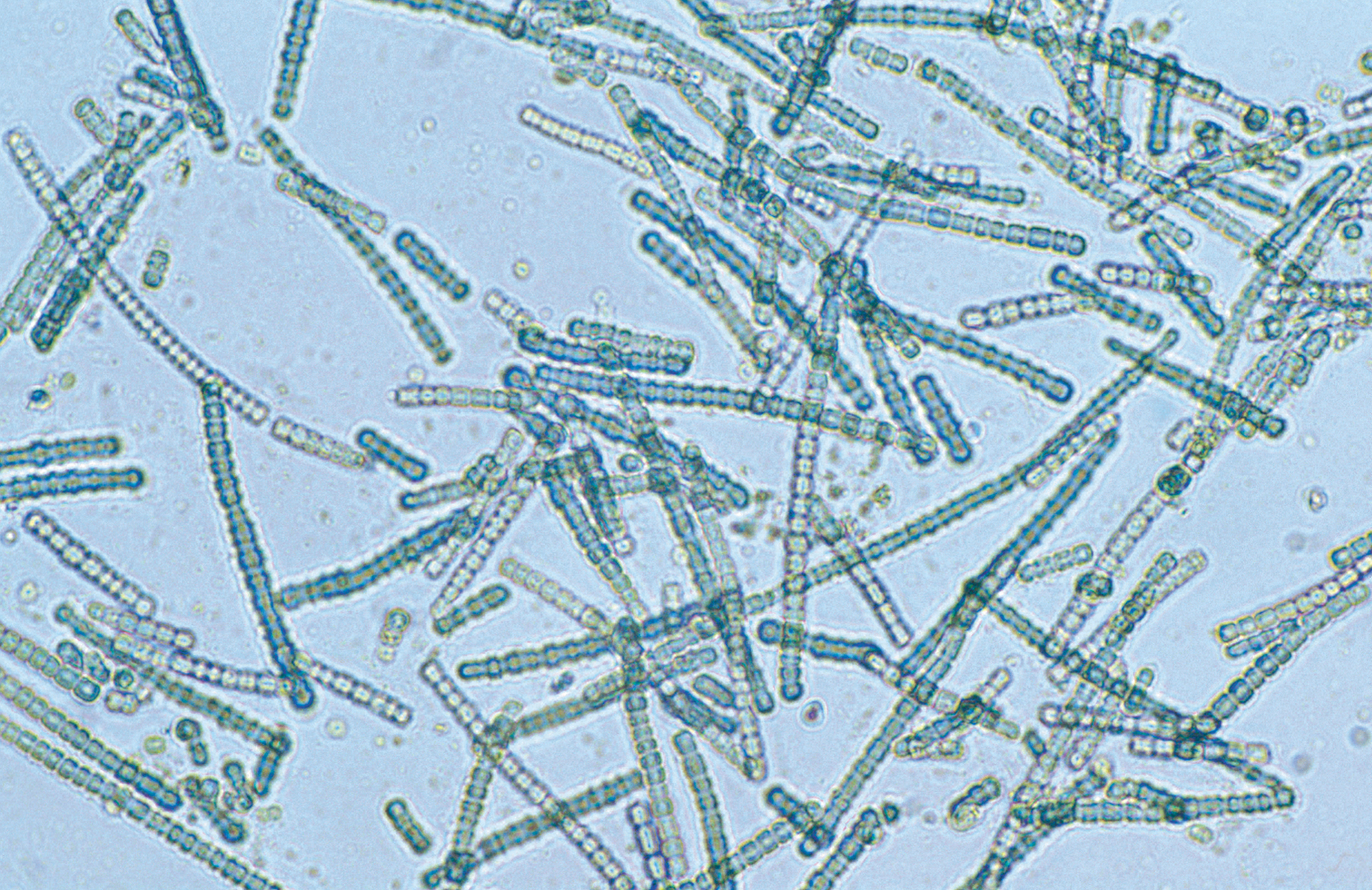
A cyanobacteria species (Cylindrospermum sp)

Diatoms

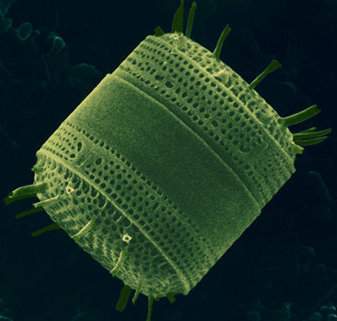
Centric

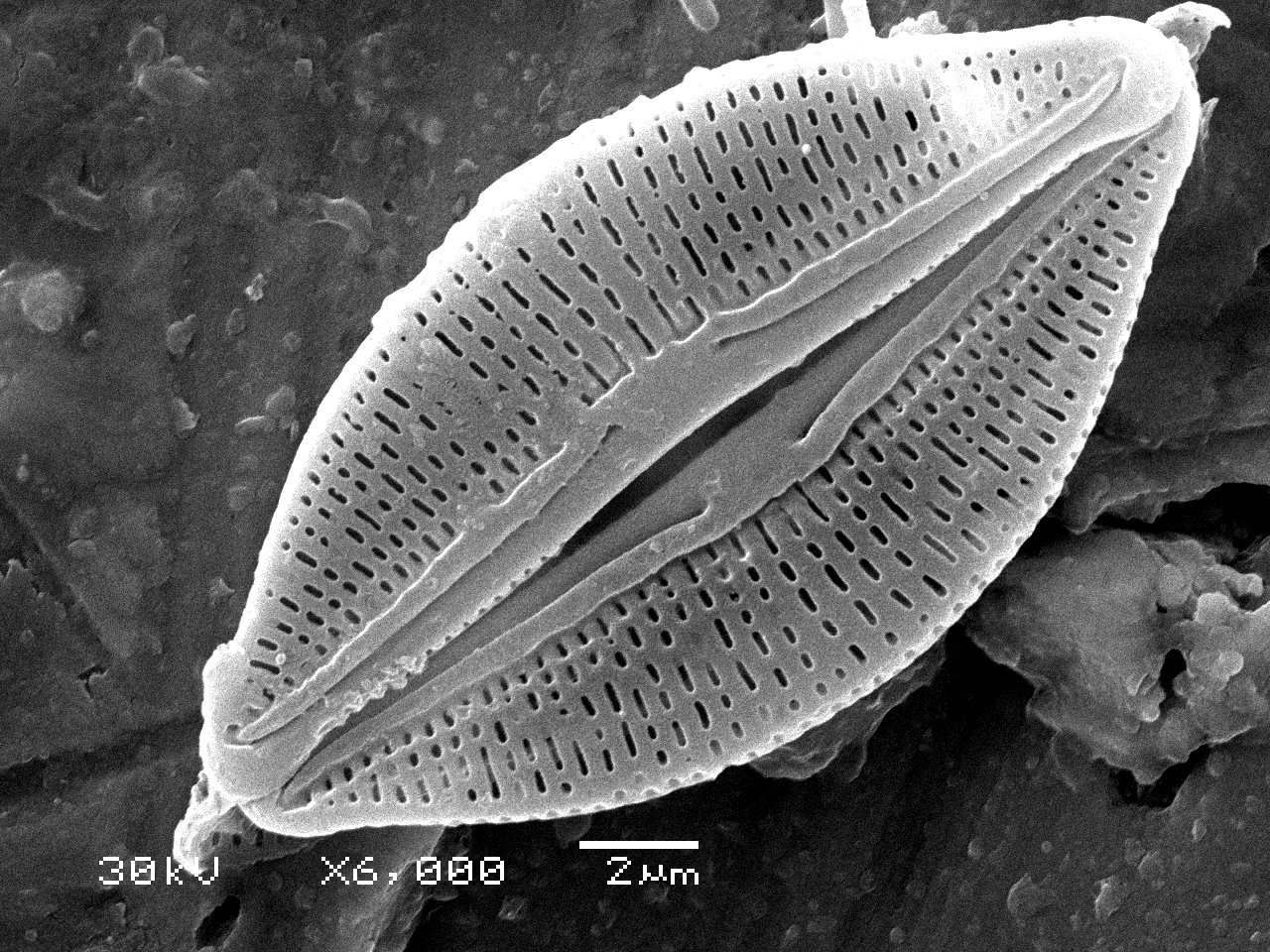
Pennate

Diatoms have a silica shell (frustule) with radial (centric) or bilateral (pennate) symmetry

Phytoplankton are very diverse, comprising photosynthesizing bacteria (cyanobacteria) and various unicellular protist groups (notably the diatoms). Many other organism groups formerly named as phytoplankton, including coccolithophores and dinoflagellates, are now no longer included as they are not only phototrophic but can also eat other organisms. These organisms are now more correctly termed mixoplankton. This recognition has important consequences for how the functioning of the planktonic food web is viewed.

== Ecology ==
Global distribution of ocean phytoplankton – NASA This visualization presents a model simulation of the dominant phytoplankton types averaged over 1994–1998. * Red = diatoms (big phytoplankton, which need silica) * Yellow = flagellates (other big phytoplankton) * Green = prochlorococcus (small phytoplankton that cannot use nitrate) * Cyan = synechococcus (other small phytoplankton) Opacity indicates the concentration of the carbon biomass. In particular, the role of the swirls and filaments (mesoscale features) appears important in maintaining high biodiversity in the ocean.

Phytoplankton obtain energy through the process of photosynthesis and must therefore live in the well-lit surface layer (termed the euphotic zone) of an ocean, sea, lake, or other body of water. Phytoplankton account for about half of all photosynthetic activity on Earth. Their cumulative energy fixation in carbon compounds (primary production) is the basis for the vast majority of oceanic and also many freshwater food webs (chemosynthesis is a notable exception).

While almost all phytoplankton species are obligate photoautotrophs, some are mixotrophic and other, non-pigmented species that are actually heterotrophic (the latter are often viewed as zooplankton). Of these, the best known are dinoflagellate genera such as Noctiluca and Dinophysis, that obtain organic carbon by ingesting other organisms or detrital material.

Phytoplankton live in the photic zone of the ocean, where photosynthesis is possible. During photosynthesis, they assimilate carbon dioxide and release oxygen. If solar radiation is too high, phytoplankton may fall victim to photodegradation. Phytoplankton species feature a large variety of photosynthetic pigments, which enable them to absorb different wavelengths of the variable underwater light. This implies different species can use the wavelength of light differently efficiently. The light is not a single ecological resource but a multitude of resources depending on its spectral composition. By that it was found that changes in the spectrum of light alone can alter natural phytoplankton communities even if the same intensity is available. For growth, phytoplankton cells additionally depend on nutrients, which enter the ocean by rivers, continental weathering, and glacial ice meltwater on the poles. Phytoplankton release dissolved organic carbon (DOC) into the sea. Since phytoplankton are the basis of marine food webs, they serve as prey for zooplankton, fish larvae, and other heterotrophic organisms. They can also be degraded by bacteria or by viral lysis. Although some phytoplankton cells, such as dinoflagellates, can migrate vertically, they are still incapable of actively moving against currents, so they slowly sink and ultimately fertilize the seafloor with dead cells and detritus.

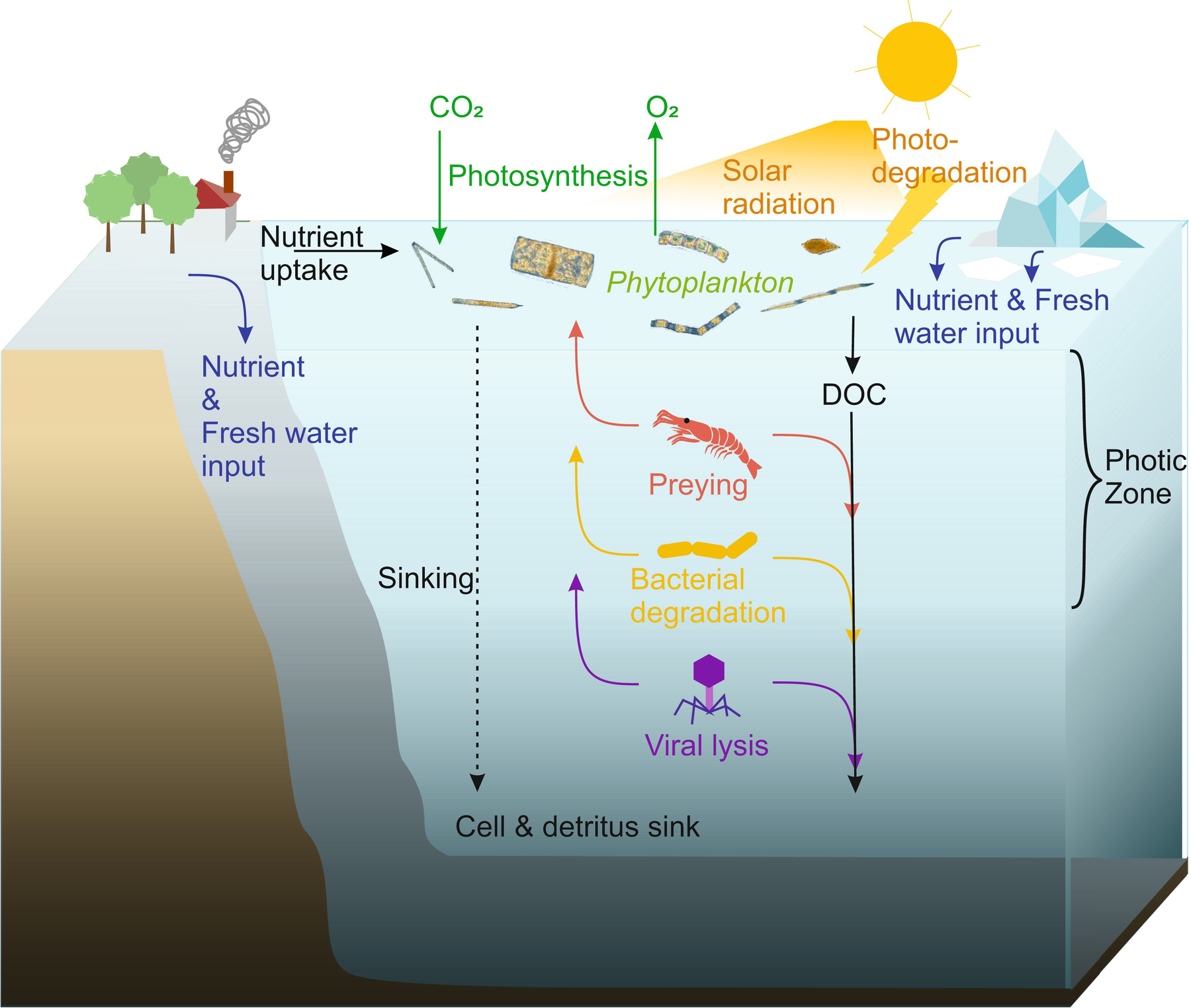
Cycling of marine phytoplankton

Phytoplankton are crucially dependent on several nutrients. These are primarily macronutrients such as nitrate, phosphate, or silicic acid, which are required in relatively large quantities for growth. Their availability in the surface ocean is governed by the balance between the so-called biological pump and upwelling of deep, nutrient-rich waters. The stoichiometric nutrient composition of phytoplankton drives — and is driven by — the Redfield ratio of macronutrients generally available throughout the surface oceans. Phytoplankton also rely on trace metals, such as iron (Fe), manganese (Mn), zinc (Zn), cobalt (Co), cadmium (Cd), and copper (Cu), as essential micronutrients, which influence their growth and community composition. Limitations in these metals can lead to co-limitations and shifts in phytoplankton community structure. Across large areas of the oceans such as the Southern Ocean, phytoplankton are often limited by the lack of the micronutrient iron. This has led to some scientists advocating iron fertilization as a means to counteract the accumulation of human-produced carbon dioxide (CO_{2}) in the atmosphere. Large-scale experiments have added iron (usually as salts such as ferrous sulfate) to the oceans to promote phytoplankton growth and draw atmospheric CO_{2} into the ocean. Controversy over ecosystem manipulation and the efficiency of iron fertilization has slowed such experiments. The ocean science community still has a divided attitude toward the study of iron fertilization as a potential marine Carbon Dioxide Removal (mCDR) approach.

Phytoplankton depend on B vitamins for survival. Areas in the ocean have been identified as having a major deficiency of certain B Vitamins and, correspondingly, phytoplankton.

The effects of anthropogenic warming on the global phytoplankton population are an area of active research. Changes in the vertical stratification of the water column, the rate of temperature-dependent biological reactions, and the atmospheric supply of nutrients are expected to have important effects on future phytoplankton productivity.

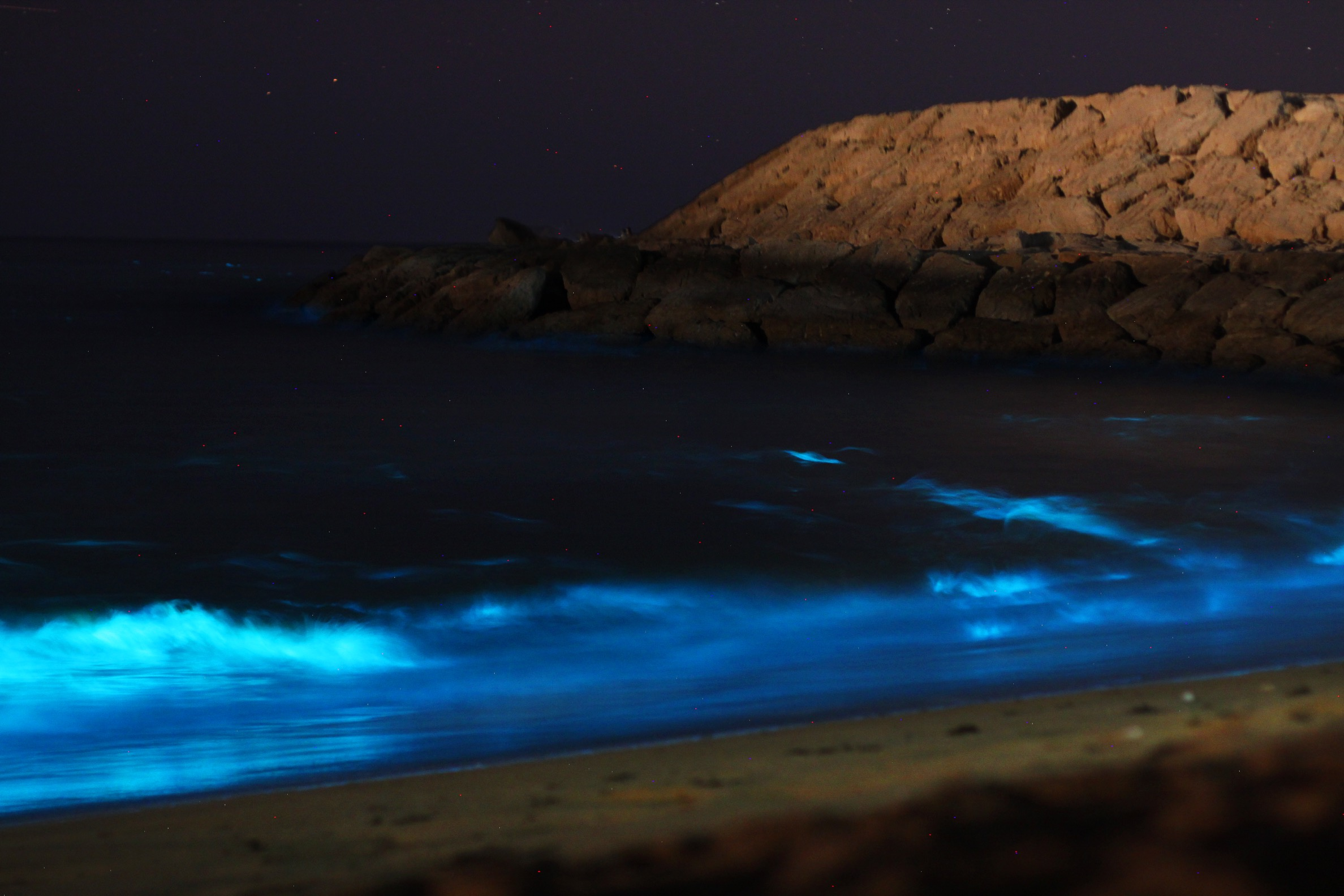
Bioluminescence in phytoplankton triggered by the agitation of waves crashing on a beach

The effects of anthropogenic ocean acidification on phytoplankton growth and community structure have also received considerable attention. The cells of coccolithophore phytoplankton are typically covered in a calcium carbonate shell called a coccosphere that is sensitive to ocean acidification. Because of their short generation times, evidence suggests that some phytoplankton can adapt to pH changes induced by increased carbon dioxide on rapid time scales (months to years).

Phytoplankton serve as the base of the aquatic food web, providing an essential ecological function for all aquatic life. Under future conditions of anthropogenic warming and ocean acidification, changes in phytoplankton mortality due to changes in rates of zooplankton grazing may be significant. One of the many food chains in the ocean – remarkable due to the small number of links – is that of phytoplankton sustaining krill (a crustacean similar to a tiny shrimp), which in turn sustain baleen whales.

The El Niño-Southern Oscillation (ENSO) cycles in the Equatorial Pacific area can affect phytoplankton. Biochemical and physical changes during ENSO cycles modify the phytoplankton community structure. Also, changes in the structure of the phytoplankton, such as a significant reduction in biomass and phytoplankton density, particularly during El Niño phases, can occur. The sensitivity of phytoplankton to environmental changes is why they are often used as indicators of estuarine and coastal ecological condition and health. To study these events, satellite ocean color observations are used to observe these changes. Satellite images help to have a better view of their global distribution.

== Diversity ==
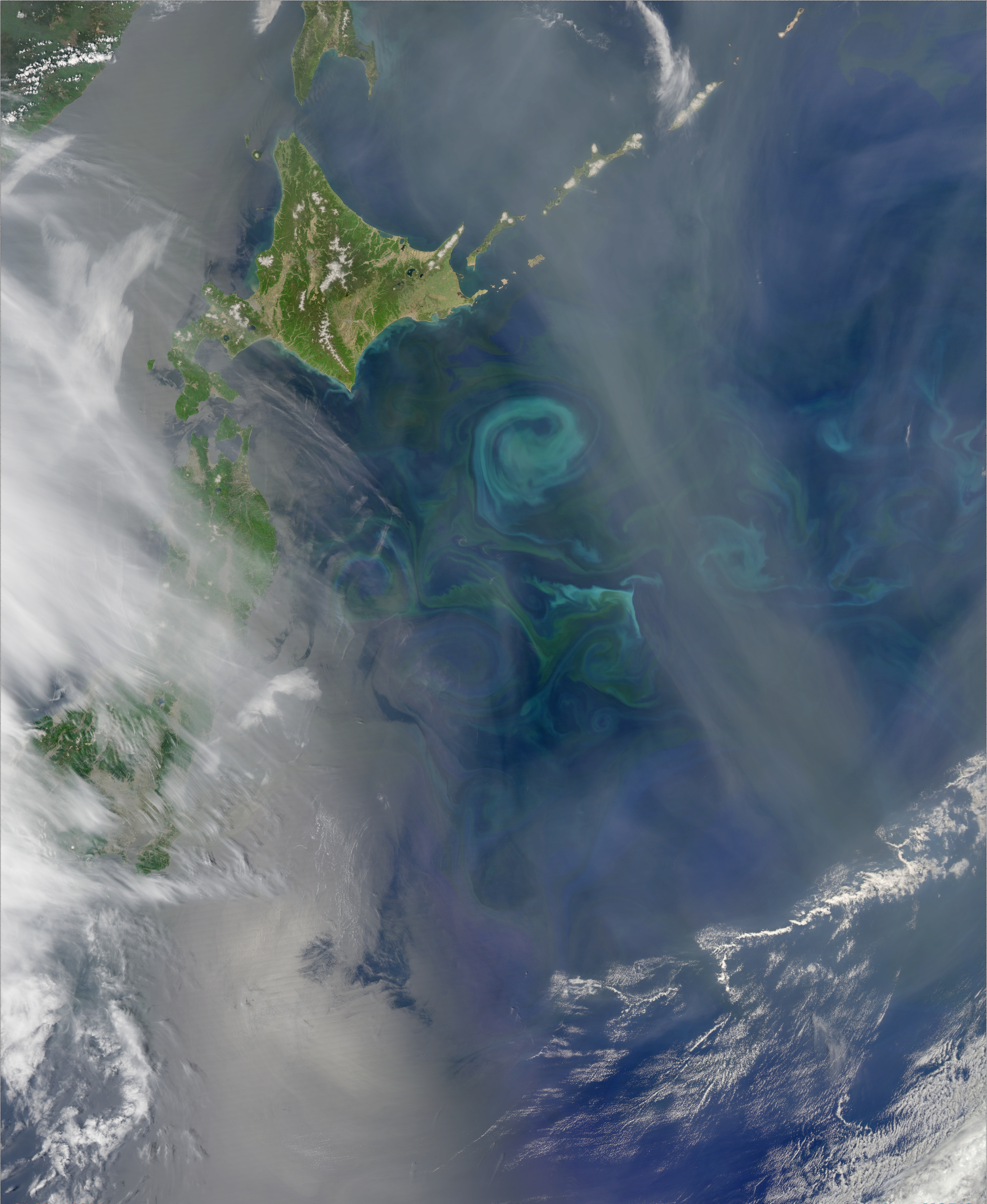
When two currents collide (here the Oyashio and Kuroshio currents) they create eddies. Phytoplankton concentrates along the boundaries of the eddies, tracing the motion of the water.

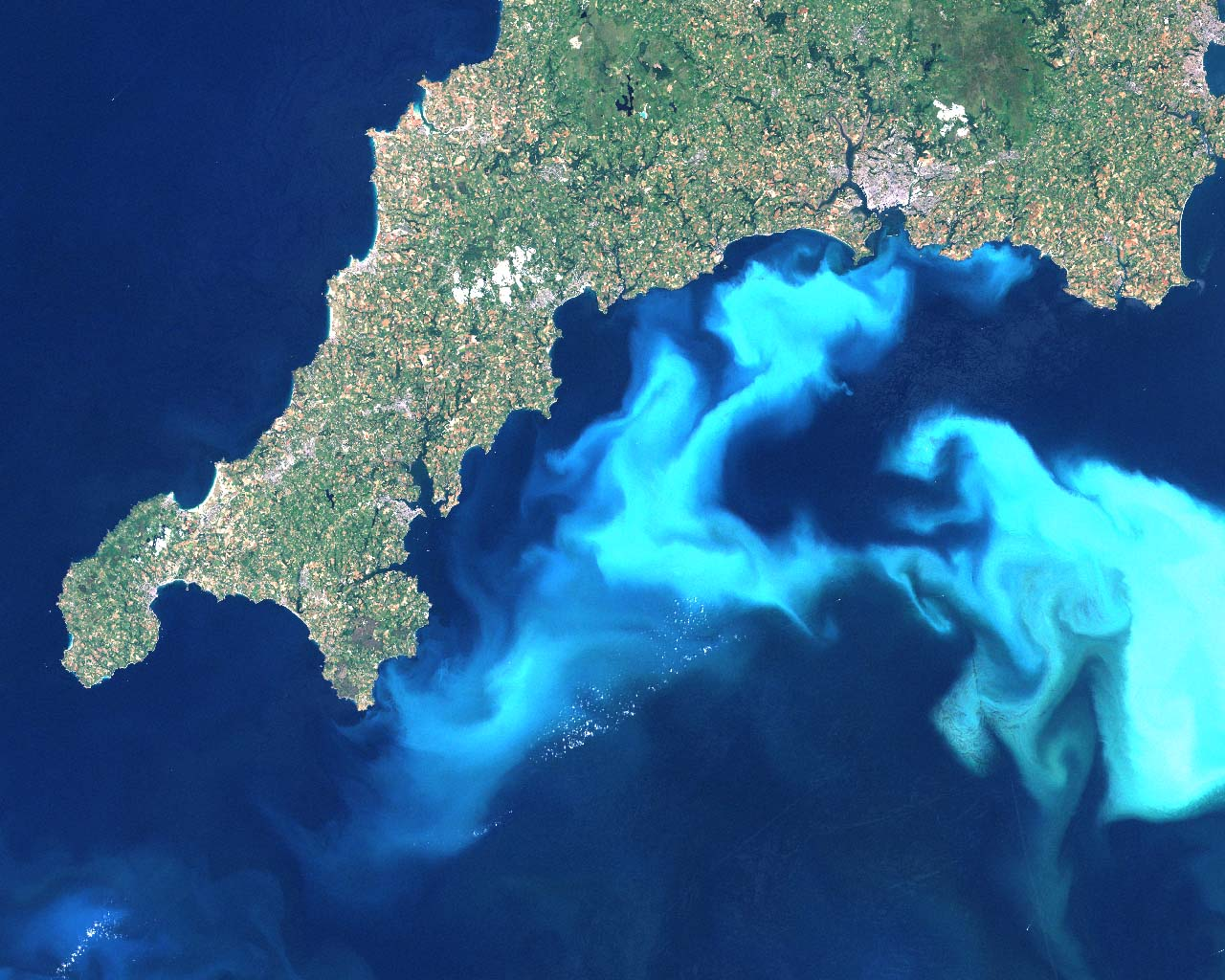
Algal bloom off south west England

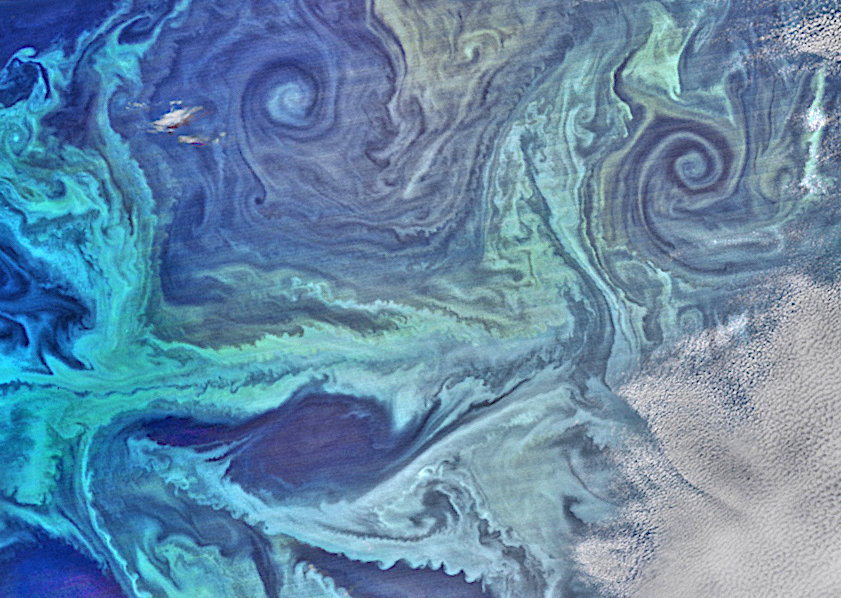
NASA satellite view of Southern Ocean phytoplankton bloom

The term phytoplankton encompasses all photoautotrophic microorganisms in aquatic food webs. However, unlike terrestrial communities, where most autotrophs are plants, phytoplankton are a diverse group, incorporating protistan eukaryotes and both eubacterial and archaebacterial prokaryotes. There are about 5,000 known species of marine phytoplankton. How such diversity evolved despite scarce resources (restricting niche differentiation) is unclear.

In terms of numbers, the most important groups of phytoplankton include the diatoms, cyanobacteria and dinoflagellates, although many other groups of algae are represented. One group, the coccolithophorids, is responsible (in part) for the release of significant amounts of dimethyl sulfide (DMS) into the atmosphere. DMS is oxidized to form sulfate which, in areas where ambient aerosol particle concentrations are low, can contribute to the population of cloud condensation nuclei, mostly leading to increased cloud cover and cloud albedo according to the so-called CLAW hypothesis. Different types of phytoplankton support different trophic levels within varying ecosystems. In oligotrophic oceanic regions such as the Sargasso Sea or the South Pacific Gyre, phytoplankton is dominated by the small sized cells, called picoplankton and nanoplankton (also referred to as picoflagellates and nanoflagellates), mostly composed of cyanobacteria (Prochlorococcus, Synechococcus) and picoeucaryotes such as Micromonas. Within more productive ecosystems, dominated by upwelling or high terrestrial inputs, larger dinoflagellates are the more dominant phytoplankton and reflect a larger portion of the biomass.

== Growth strategies ==
In the early twentieth century, Alfred C. Redfield found the similarity of the phytoplankton's elemental composition to the major dissolved nutrients in the deep ocean. Redfield proposed that the ratio of carbon to nitrogen to phosphorus (106:16:1) in the ocean was controlled by the phytoplankton's requirements, as phytoplankton subsequently release nitrogen and phosphorus as they are remineralized. This so-called "Redfield ratio" in describing the stoichiometry of phytoplankton and seawater has become a fundamental principle for understanding marine ecology, biogeochemistry, and phytoplankton evolution. However, the Redfield ratio is not a universal value and it may diverge due to the changes in exogenous nutrient delivery and microbial metabolisms in the ocean, such as nitrogen fixation, denitrification and anammox.

The dynamic stoichiometry observed in unicellular algae reflects their ability to store nutrients in an internal pool, shift between enzymes with varying nutrient requirements, and alter osmolyte composition. Different cellular components have their own unique stoichiometry characteristics, for instance, resource (light or nutrients) acquisition machinery such as proteins and chlorophyll contain a high concentration of nitrogen but low in phosphorus. Meanwhile, growth machinery, such as ribosomal RNA, contains high concentrations of nitrogen and phosphorus.

Based on allocation of resources, phytoplankton is classified into three different growth strategies, namely survivalist, bloomer and generalist. Survivalist phytoplankton have a high N:P ratio (>30) and possess abundant machinery for resource acquisition to sustain growth under resource scarcity. Bloomer phytoplankton has a low N:P ratio (<10), contains a high proportion of growth machinery, and is adapted to exponential growth. Generalist phytoplankton have N:P ratios similar to the Redfield ratio and contain relatively equal resource-acquisition and growth machinery.

== Factors affecting abundance ==
The NAAMES study was a five-year scientific research program conducted between 2015 and 2019 by scientists from Oregon State University and NASA to investigated aspects of phytoplankton dynamics in ocean ecosystems, and how such dynamics influence atmospheric aerosols, clouds, and climate (NAAMES stands for the North Atlantic Aerosols and Marine Ecosystems Study). The study focused on the sub-arctic region of the North Atlantic Ocean, which is the site of one of Earth's largest recurring phytoplankton blooms. The long history of research in this location, as well as the relative ease of accessibility, made the North Atlantic an ideal location to test prevailing scientific hypotheses in an effort to better understand the role of phytoplankton aerosol emissions on Earth's energy budget.

NAAMES was designed to target specific phases of the annual phytoplankton cycle: minimum, climax, and the intermediary decreasing and increasing biomass, to resolve debates on the timing of bloom formations and the patterns driving annual bloom re-creation. The NAAMES project also investigated the quantity, size, and composition of aerosols generated by primary production to understand how phytoplankton bloom cycles affect cloud formations and climate.

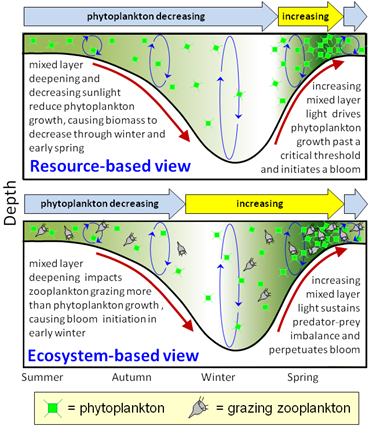
Competing hypothesis of plankton variability Figure adapted from Behrenfeld & Boss 2014. Courtesy of NAAMES, Langley Research Center, NASA

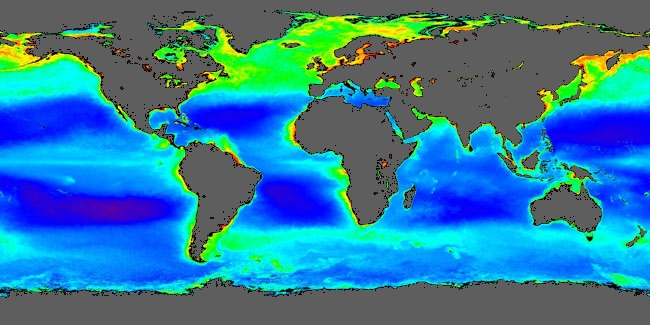
World concentrations of surface ocean chlorophyll as viewed by satellite during the northern spring, averaged from 1998 to 2004. Chlorophyll is a marker for the distribution and abundance of phytoplankton.

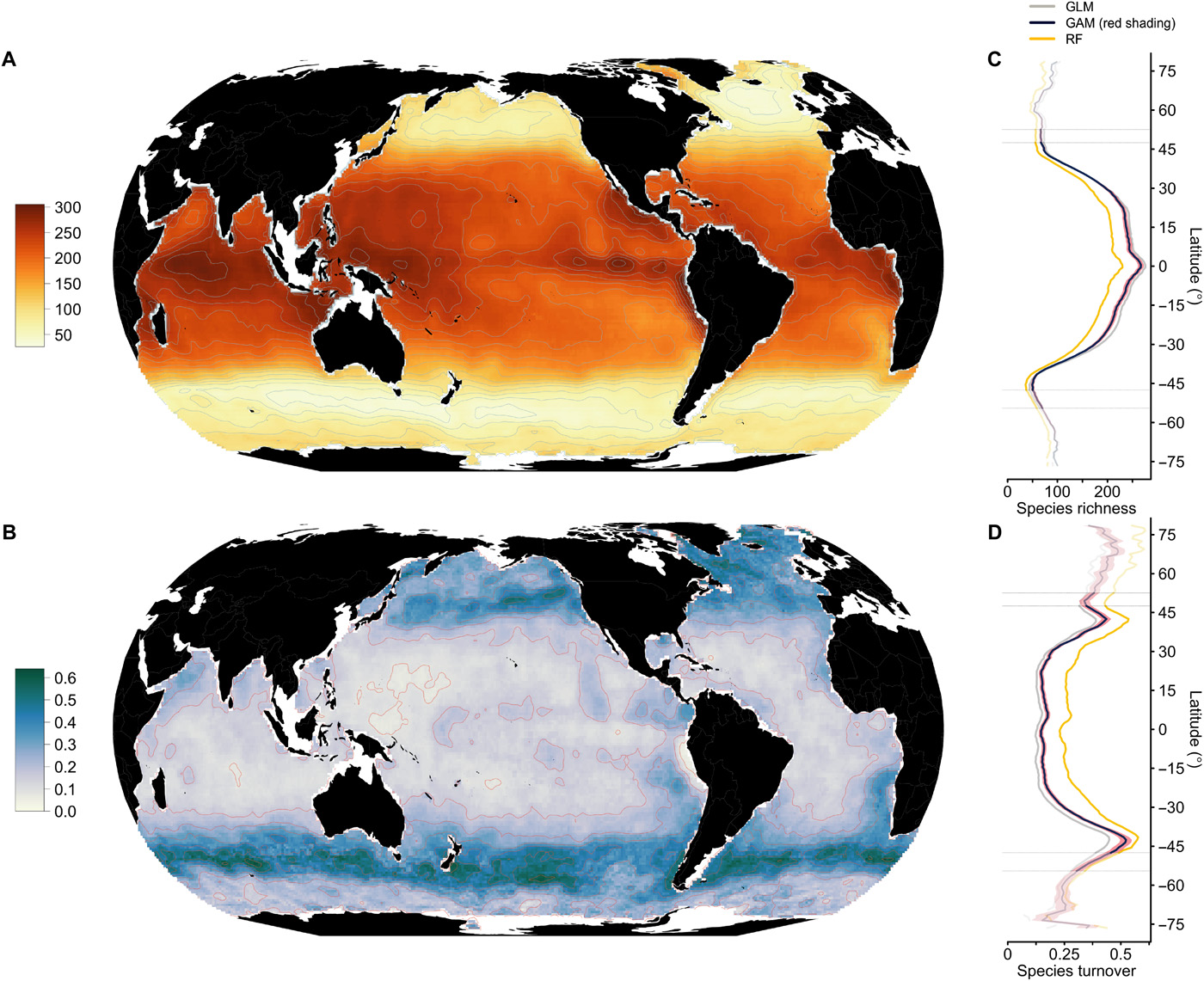
Global patterns of monthly phytoplankton species richness and species turnover (A) Annual mean of monthly species richness and (B) month-to-month species turnover projected by SDMs. Latitudinal gradients of (C) richness and (D) turnover. Colored lines (regressions with local polynomial fitting) indicate the means per degree latitude from three different SDM algorithms used (red shading denotes ±1 SD from 1000 Monte Carlo runs that used varying predictors for GAM). Poleward of the thin horizontal lines shown in (C) and (D), the model results cover only <12 or <9 months, respectively.

== Factors affecting productivity ==
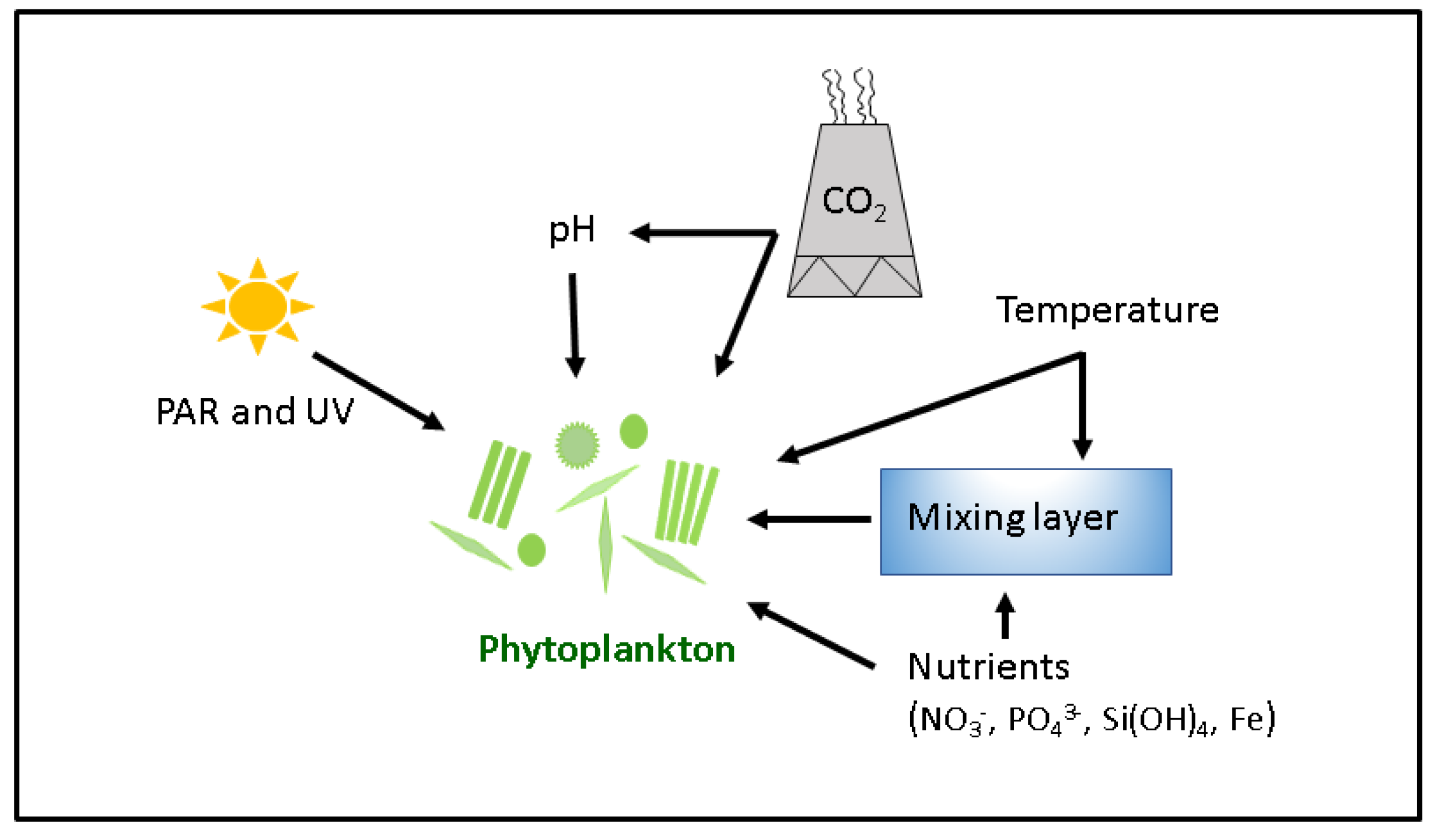
Environmental factors that affect phytoplankton productivity

Phytoplankton are the key mediators of the biological pump. Understanding phytoplankton's response to changing environmental conditions is a prerequisite for predicting future atmospheric CO_{2} concentrations. Temperature, irradiance, nutrient concentrations, and CO_{2} are the chief environmental factors that influence the physiology and stoichiometry of phytoplankton. The stoichiometry or elemental composition of phytoplankton is of utmost importance to secondary producers such as copepods, fish and shrimp, because it determines the nutritional quality and influences energy flow through the marine food chains. Climate change may greatly restructure phytoplankton communities leading to cascading consequences for marine food webs, thereby altering the amount of carbon transported to the ocean interior.

The figure provides an overview of the environmental factors that collectively affect phytoplankton productivity. All of these factors are expected to undergo significant changes in the future ocean due to global change. Global warming simulations predict oceanic temperature increase; dramatic changes in oceanic stratification, circulation and changes in cloud cover and sea ice, resulting in an increased light supply to the ocean surface. Also, reduced nutrient supply is predicted to co-occur with ocean acidification and warming, due to increased water-column stratification and reduced nutrient mixing from deep waters to the surface.

== Role of phytoplankton ==
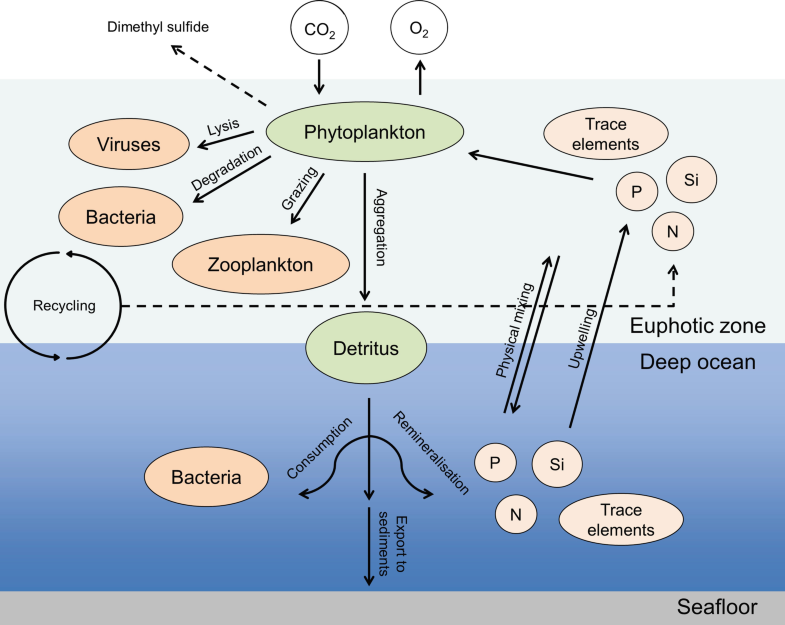
Role of phytoplankton on various compartments of the marine environment

The compartments influenced by phytoplankton include atmospheric gas composition, inorganic nutrients, trace-element fluxes, and the transfer and cycling of organic matter via biological processes (see figure). Photosynthetically fixed carbon is rapidly recycled and reused in the surface ocean. At the same time, a certain fraction of this biomass is exported as sinking particles to the deep sea, where it is subject to ongoing transformation processes, e.g., remineralization.

Phytoplankton contribute not only to a basic pelagic marine food web but also to the microbial loop. Phytoplankton are the base of the marine food web, and because they do not rely on other organisms for food, they make up the first trophic level. Organisms such as zooplankton feed on these phytoplankton, which are in turn fed on by other organisms, and so on, until the fourth trophic level is reached, with apex predators. Approximately 90% of total carbon is lost between trophic levels due to respiration, detritus, and dissolved organic matter. This underscores the importance of the remineralization process and nutrient cycling performed by phytoplankton and bacteria in maintaining efficiency.

Phytoplankton blooms in which a species increases rapidly under conditions favorable to growth can produce harmful algal blooms (HABs).

== Aquaculture ==
Phytoplankton are a key food item in both aquaculture and mariculture. Both utilize phytoplankton as food for the animals being farmed. In mariculture, phytoplankton is naturally occurring and introduced into enclosures through the normal seawater circulation. In aquaculture, phytoplankton must be obtained and introduced directly. Plankton can be collected from a body of water or cultured, though the former method is rarely used. Phytoplankton is used as a foodstock for the production of rotifers, which are in turn used to feed other organisms. Phytoplankton is also used to feed wide varieties of aquacultured molluscs, including pearl oysters and giant clams. A 2018 study estimated the nutritional value of natural phytoplankton in terms of carbohydrate, protein and lipid across the world ocean using ocean-colour data from satellites, and found the calorific value of phytoplankton to vary considerably across different oceanic regions and between different time of the year.

The production of phytoplankton under controlled conditions constitutes a form of aquaculture. Phytoplankton is cultured for a variety of purposes, including foodstock for other aquacultured organisms, a nutritional supplement for captive invertebrates in aquaria. Culture sizes range from small-scale laboratory cultures of less than one litre to tens of thousands of litres in commercial aquaculture. Regardless of the size of the culture, certain conditions must be provided for efficient growth of plankton. The majority of cultured plankton is marine, and seawater of a specific gravity of 1.010 to 1.026 may be used as a culture medium. This water must be sterilized, usually by either high temperatures in an autoclave or by exposure to ultraviolet radiation, to prevent biological contamination of the culture. Various fertilizers are added to the culture medium to promote plankton growth. A culture must be aerated or agitated in some way to keep plankton suspended, as well as to provide dissolved carbon dioxide for photosynthesis. In addition to constant aeration, most cultures are manually mixed or stirred regularly. Light is required for phytoplankton growth. The color temperature of illumination should be approximately 6,500 K, but values from 4,000 K to 20,000 K or higher have been used successfully. The duration of light exposure should be approximately 16 hours daily; this is the most efficient artificial day length.

== Anthropogenic changes ==
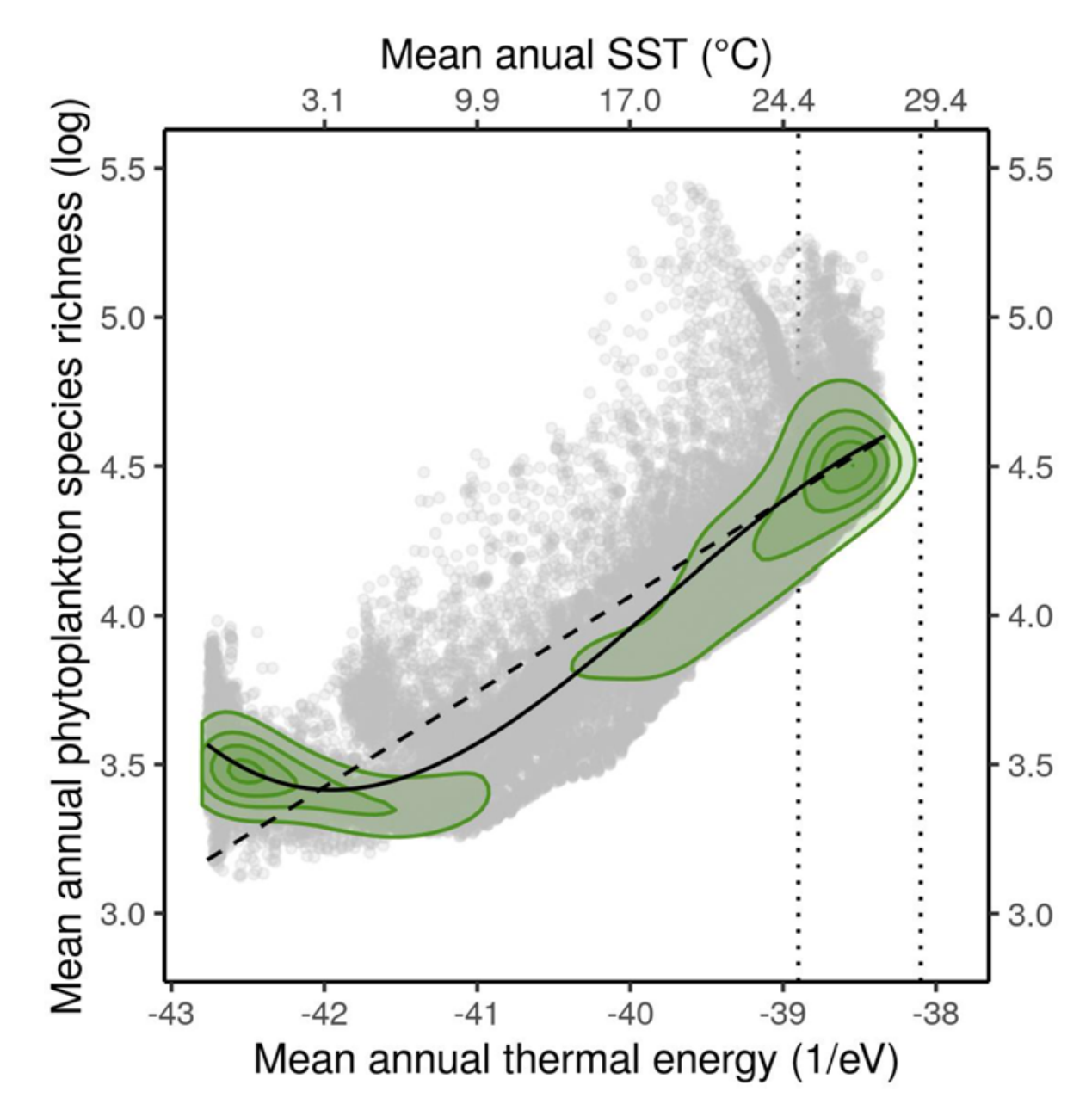
Plot demonstrating increases in phytoplankton species richness with increased temperature

Marine phytoplankton perform half of the global photosynthetic CO_{2} fixation (net global primary production of ~50 Pg C per year) and half of the oxygen production despite amounting to only ~1% of global plant biomass. In comparison with terrestrial plants, marine phytoplankton are distributed over a larger surface area, are exposed to less seasonal variation, and have markedly faster turnover rates than trees (days versus decades). Therefore, phytoplankton respond rapidly on a global scale to climate variations. These characteristics are important when evaluating phytoplankton contributions to carbon fixation and forecasting how this production may change in response to perturbations. Predicting the effects of climate change on primary productivity is complicated by phytoplankton bloom cycles, which are influenced by both bottom-up (e.g., nutrient availability and vertical mixing) and top-down (e.g., grazing and viral control) factors. Increases in solar radiation, temperature and freshwater inputs to surface waters strengthen ocean stratification and consequently reduce transport of nutrients from deep water to surface waters, which reduces primary productivity. Conversely, rising CO_{2} levels can increase phytoplankton primary production, but only when nutrients are not limiting.

Some studies indicate that global phytoplankton density has decreased over the past century. Still, these conclusions have been questioned due to the limited availability of long-term phytoplankton data, methodological differences in data generation, and the pronounced annual and decadal variability in phytoplankton production. Moreover, other studies suggest a global increase in oceanic phytoplankton production and changes in specific regions or specific phytoplankton groups. The global Sea Ice Index is declining, leading to higher light penetration and potentially more primary production; however, there are conflicting predictions for the effects of variable mixing patterns and changes in nutrient supply and for productivity trends in polar zones.

The effect of human-caused climate change on phytoplankton biodiversity remains poorly understood. Should greenhouse gas emissions continue rising to high levels by 2100, some phytoplankton models predict an increase in species richness, or the number of different species within a given area. This increase in plankton diversity is traced to warming ocean temperatures. In addition to changes in species richness, the distribution of phytoplankton is expected to shift towards the Earth's poles. Such movement may disrupt ecosystems because phytoplankton are consumed by zooplankton, which in turn sustain fisheries. This shift in phytoplankton distribution may also diminish their ability to sequester carbon emitted by human activities. Human (anthropogenic) changes to phytoplankton impact both natural and economic processes.

== See also ==
- Algaculture – Aquaculture involving the farming of algae
- AlgaeBase – Species database
- Algal bloom – Spread of planktonic algae in water
- Bacterioplankton – Bacterial component of the plankton that drifts in the water column
- Biological pump – Carbon capture process in oceans
- CLAW hypothesis – Hypothesised negative feedback loop linking marine biota and the climate
- Critical depth
- Deep chlorophyll maximum
- Freshwater phytoplankton – Phytoplankton occurring in freshwater ecosystems
- Iron fertilization – Ecological concept
- Microphyte – Microscopic algae (microalgae)
- NAAMES
- Ocean acidification – Decrease of pH levels in the ocean
- Paradox of the plankton – High plankton diversity despite scarce resources
- Parasites of phytoplankton
- Photosynthetic picoplankton – Group of photosynthetic plankton
- Whiting event – Suspension of fine-grained calcium carbonate particles in water bodies
- Thin layers (oceanography) – Congregations of plankton
