= Marine viruses =

Viruses found in marine environments

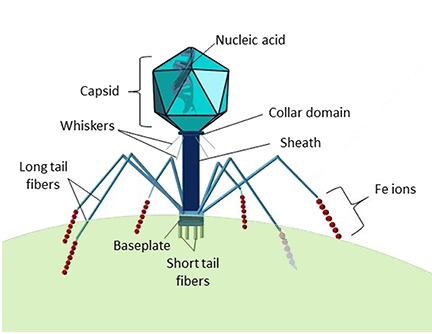
Structure of a typical virus, in this case a phage. The appearance of these viruses has been likened to a miniature lunar lander. Marine viruses are essential to the regulation of marine ecosystems.

Marine viruses are defined by their habitat as viruses that are found in marine environments, that is, in the saltwater of seas or oceans or the brackish water of coastal estuaries. Viruses are small infectious agents that can only replicate inside the living cells of a host organism, because they need the replication machinery of the host to do so. They can infect all types of life forms, from animals and plants to microorganisms, including bacteria and archaea.

When not inside a cell or in the process of infecting a cell, viruses exist in the form of independent particles called virions. A virion contains a genome (a long molecule that carries genetic information in the form of either DNA or RNA) surrounded by a capsid (a protein coat protecting the genetic material). The shapes of these virus particles range from simple helical and icosahedral forms for some virus species to more complex structures for others. Most virus species have virions that are too small to be seen with an optical microscope. The average virion is about one one-hundredth the linear size of the average bacterium.

A teaspoon of seawater typically contains about fifty million viruses. Most of these viruses are bacteriophages which infect and destroy marine bacteria and control the growth of phytoplankton at the base of the marine food web. Bacteriophages are harmless to plants and animals but are essential to the regulation of marine ecosystems. They supply key mechanisms for recycling ocean carbon and nutrients. In a process known as the viral shunt, organic molecules released from dead bacterial cells stimulate fresh bacterial and algal growth. In particular, the breaking down of bacteria by viruses (lysis) has been shown to enhance nitrogen cycling and stimulate phytoplankton growth. Viral activity also affects the biological pump, the process which sequesters carbon in the deep ocean. By increasing the amount of respiration in the oceans, viruses are indirectly responsible for reducing the amount of carbon dioxide in the atmosphere by approximately 3 gigatonnes of carbon per year.

Marine microorganisms make up about 70% of the total marine biomass. It is estimated marine viruses kill 20% of the microorganism biomass every day. Viruses are the main agents responsible for the rapid destruction of harmful algal blooms which often kill other marine life. The number of viruses in the oceans decreases further offshore and deeper into the water, where there are fewer host organisms. Viruses are an important natural means of transferring genes between different species, which increases genetic diversity and drives evolution. It is thought viruses played a central role in early evolution before the diversification of bacteria, archaea and eukaryotes, at the time of the last universal common ancestor of life on Earth. Viruses are still one of the largest areas of unexplored genetic diversity on Earth.

== Background ==
Viruses are now recognised as ancient and as having origins that pre-date the divergence of life into the three domains. They are found wherever there is life and have probably existed since living cells first evolved. The origins of viruses in the evolutionary history of life are unclear because they do not form fossils. Molecular techniques are used to compare the DNA or RNA of viruses and are a useful means of investigating how they arose. Some viruses may have evolved from plasmids—pieces of DNA that can move between cells—while others may have evolved from bacteria. In evolution, viruses are an important means of horizontal gene transfer, which increases genetic diversity.

Opinions differ on whether viruses are a form of life or organic structures that interact with living organisms. They are considered by some to be a life form, because they carry genetic material, reproduce by creating multiple copies of themselves through self-assembly, and evolve through natural selection. However they lack key characteristics such as a cellular structure generally considered necessary to count as life. Because they possess some but not all such qualities, viruses have been described as replicators and as "organisms at the edge of life".

The existence of viruses in the ocean was discovered through electron microscopy and epifluorescence microscopy of ecological water samples, and later through metagenomic sampling of uncultured viral samples. Marine viruses, although microscopic and essentially unnoticed by scientists until recently, are the most abundant and diverse biological entities in the ocean. Viruses have an estimated abundance of 10^{30} in the ocean, or between 10^{6} and 10^{11} viruses per millilitre. Quantification of marine viruses was originally performed using transmission electron microscopy but has been replaced by epifluorescence or flow cytometry.

== Bacteriophages ==
Phage injecting its genome into bacteria

Bacteriophages, often contracted to phages, are viruses that parasitize bacteria for replication. As aptly named, marine phages parasitize marine bacteria, such as cyanobacteria. They are a diverse group of viruses which are the most abundant biological entity in marine environments, because their hosts, bacteria, are typically the numerically dominant cellular life in the sea. There are up to ten times more phages in the oceans than there are bacteria, reaching levels of 250 million bacteriophages per millilitre of seawater. These viruses infect specific bacteria by binding to surface receptor molecules and then entering the cell. Within a short amount of time, in some cases just minutes, bacterial polymerase starts translating viral mRNA into protein. These proteins go on to become either new virions within the cell, helper proteins, which help assembly of new virions, or proteins involved in cell lysis. Viral enzymes aid in the breakdown of the cell membrane, and there are phages that can replicate three hundred phages twenty minutes after injection.

Bacteriophages (phages)

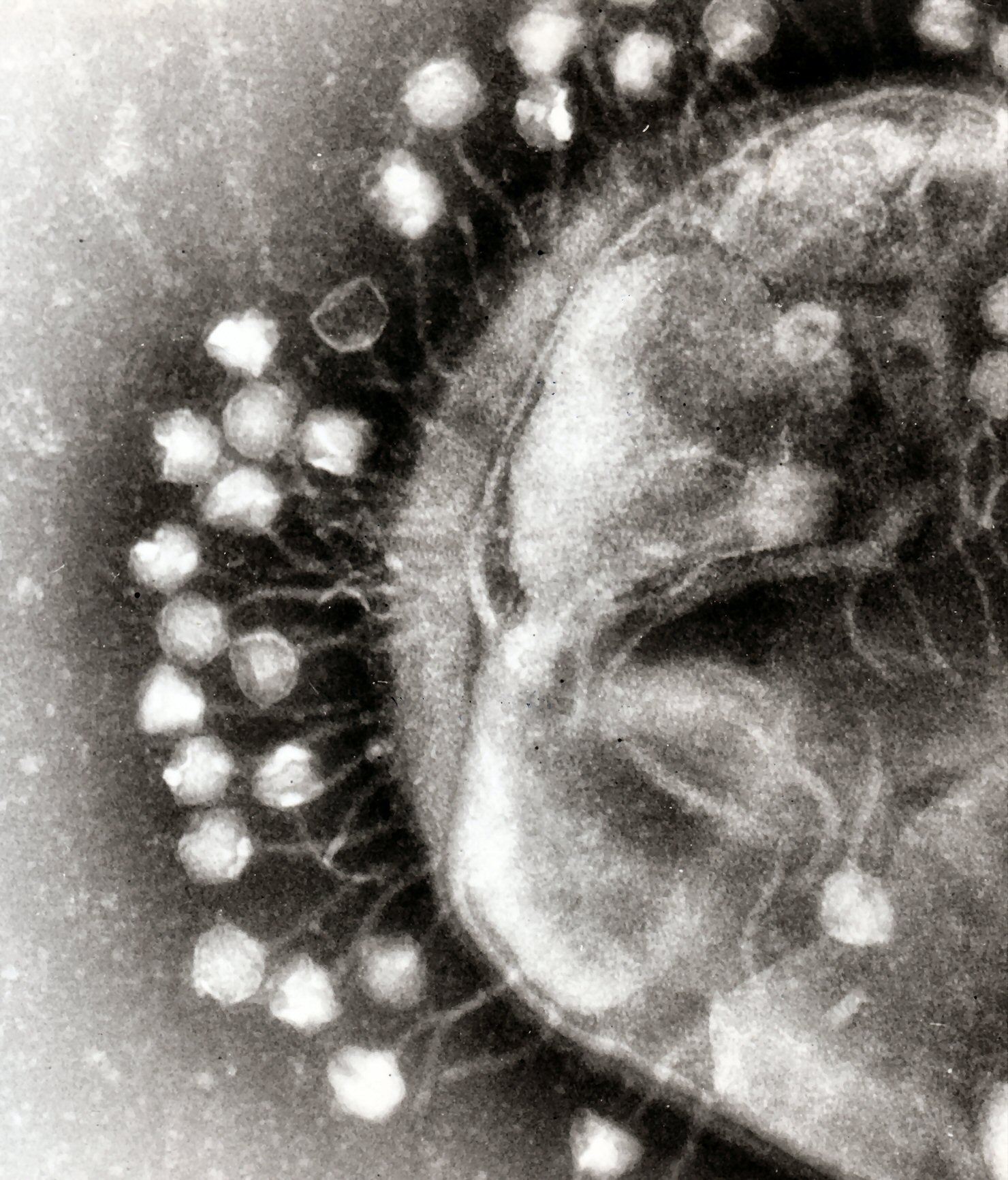
Multiple phages attached to a bacterial cell wall at 200,000x magnification

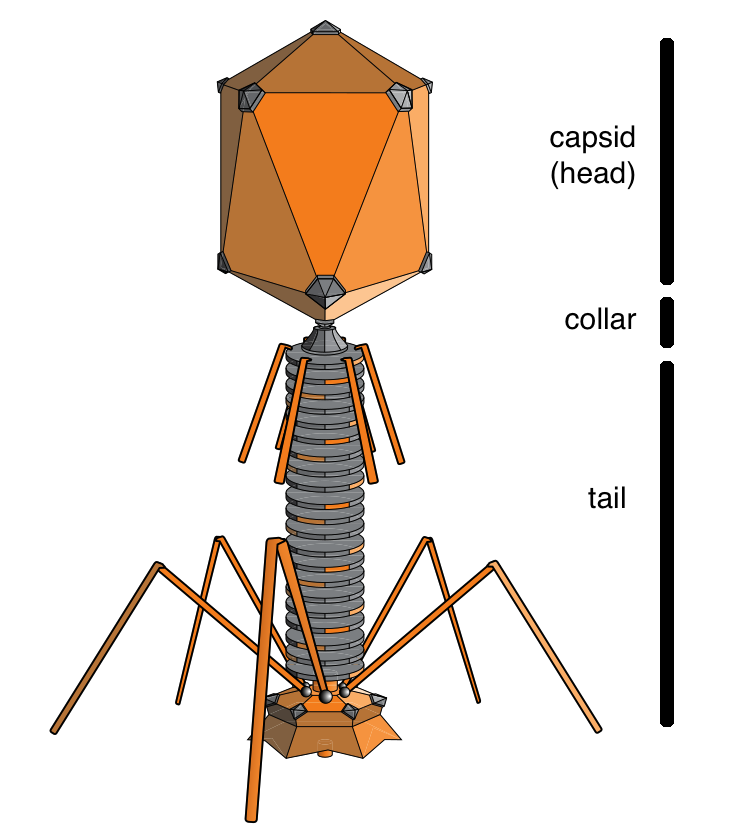
Diagram of a typical tailed phage

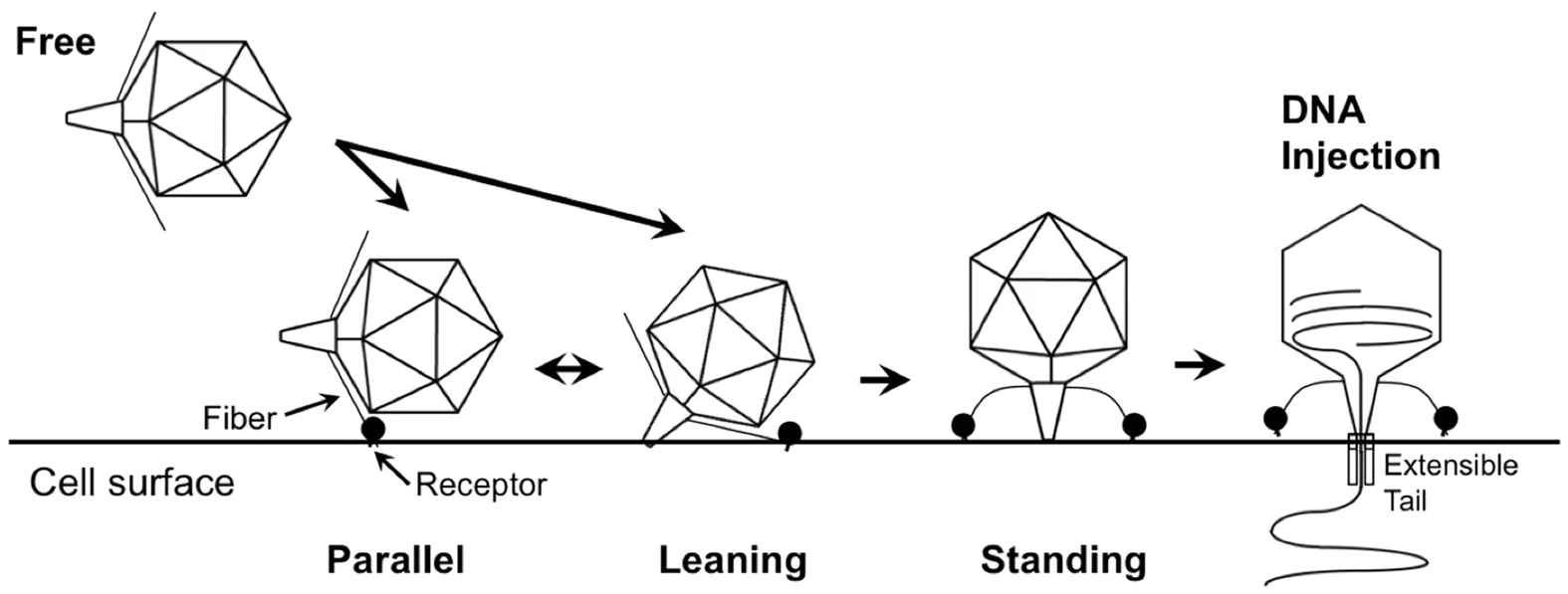
Process of a phage "landing" on a bacterium The phage first adheres to the cell surface with its tail parallel to or leaning at an angle to the cell surface in the pre-infection stage. The tail then firmly stands on the cell surface and extends its fibers horizontally, rendering the phage infection-competent, after which viral DNA is released into the cell through an extensible tube. based on observations of the model cyanophage P-SSP7 interacting with the marine Prochlorococcus MED4 bacterium

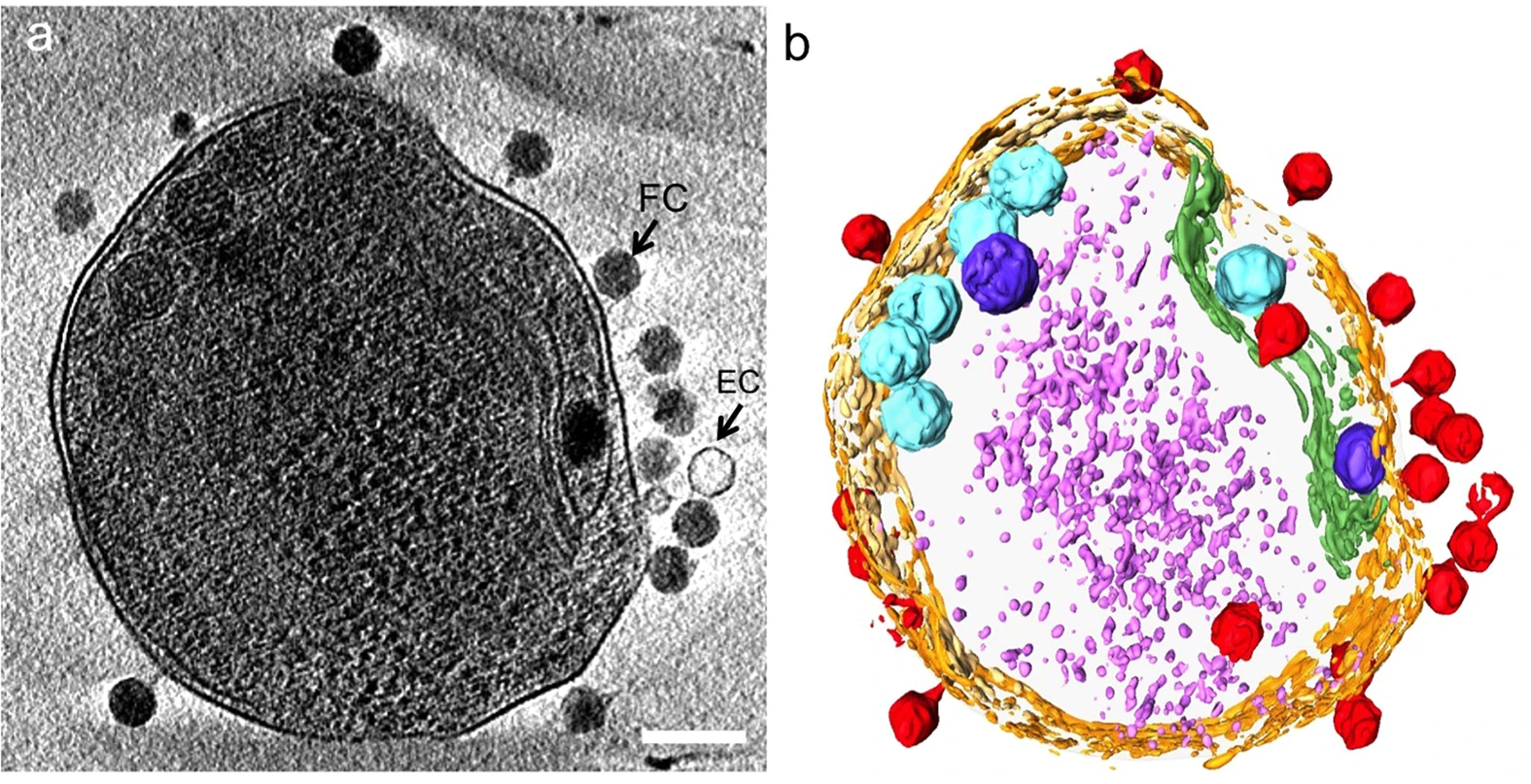
Adsorption of cyanophages onto a marine Prochlorococcus (a) Slice (~20 nm) through a reconstructed tomogram of P-SSP7 phage incubated with MED4, imaged at ~86 min post-infection. FC and EC show full-DNA capsid phage and empty capsid phage, respectively. (b) same image visualised by highlighting the cell wall in orange, the plasma membrane in light yellow, the thylakoid membrane in green, carboxysomes in cyan, the polyphosphate body in blue, adsorbed phages on the sides or top of the cell in red, and cytoplasmic granules (probably mostly ribosomes) in light purple. scale bar: 200 nm

Bacteria defend themselves from bacteriophages by producing enzymes that destroy foreign DNA. These enzymes, called restriction endonucleases, cut up the viral DNA that bacteriophages inject into bacterial cells. Bacteria also contain a system that uses CRISPR sequences to retain fragments of the genomes of viruses that the bacteria have come into contact with in the past, which allows them to block the virus's replication through a form of RNA interference. This genetic system provides bacteria with acquired immunity to infection.

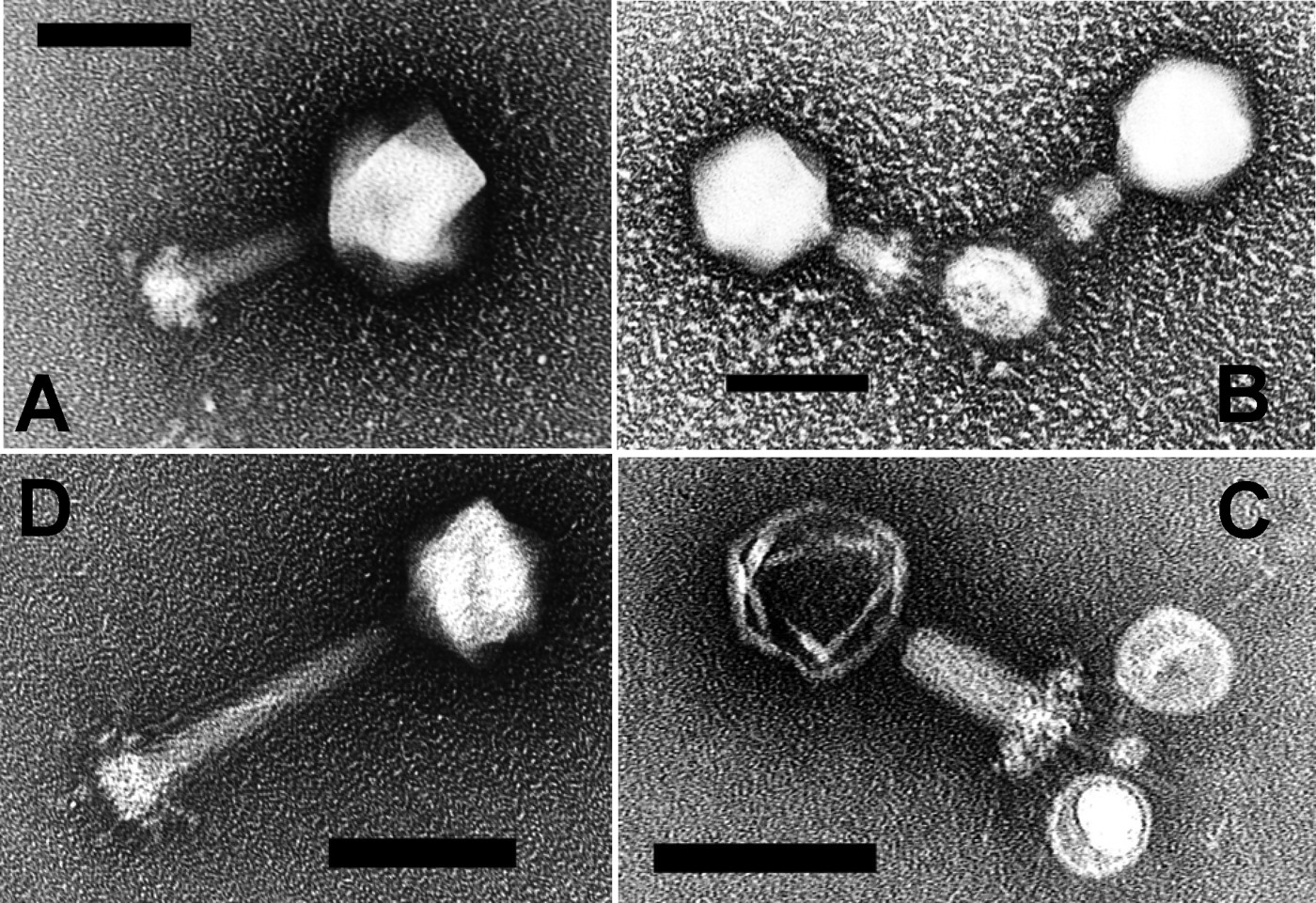
Cyanophages, viruses that infect cyanobacteria scale bars: 100 nm

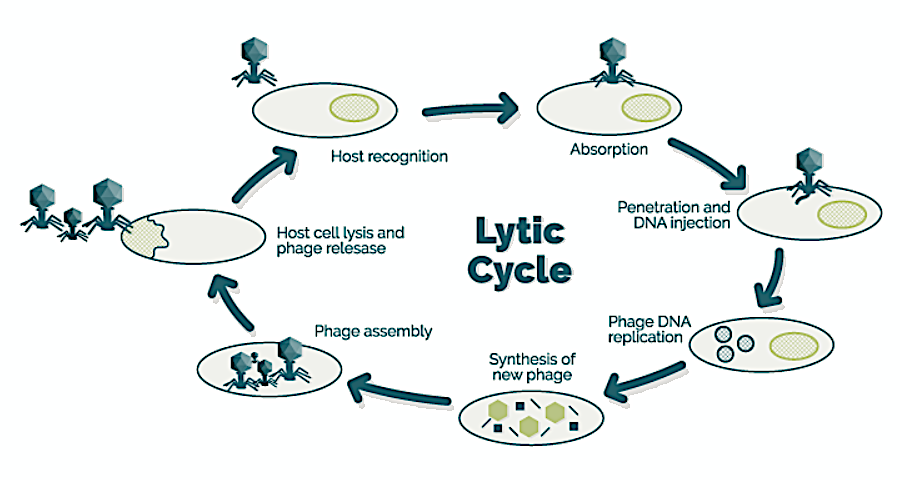
The lytic cycle, the reproductive cycle of the bacteriophage, has six stages: → attachment: the phage attaches itself to the surface of the host cell → penetration: the phage injects its DNA through the cell membrane → transcription: the host cell's DNA is degraded and the cell's metabolism is directed to initiate phage biosynthesis → biosynthesis: the phage DNA replicates inside the cell → maturation: the replicated material assembles into fully formed viral phages → lysis: the newly formed phages are released from the infected cell (which is itself destroyed in the process) to seek out new host cells

Microbes drive the nutrient transformations that sustain Earth's ecosystems, and the viruses that infect these microbes modulate both microbial population size and diversity. The cyanobacterium Prochlorococcus, the most abundant oxygenic phototroph on Earth, contributes a substantial fraction of global primary carbon production, and often reaches densities of over 100,000 cells per milliliter in oligotrophic and temperate oceans. Hence, viral (cyanophage) infection and lysis of Prochlorococcus represent an important component of the global carbon cycle. In addition to their ecological role in inducing host mortality, cyanophages influence the metabolism and evolution of their hosts by co-opting and exchanging genes, including core photosynthesis genes.

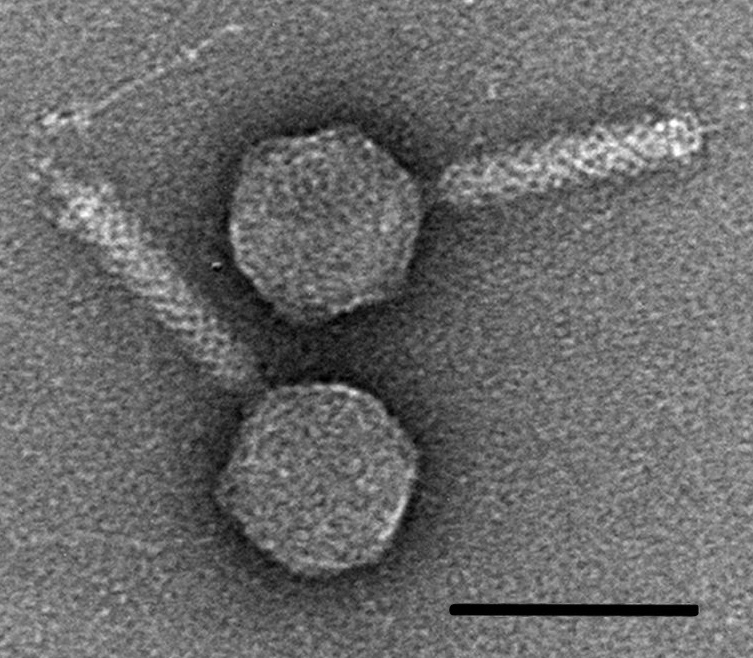
Tailed V22 phages of Alteromonas bacteria
scale bar : 100 nm

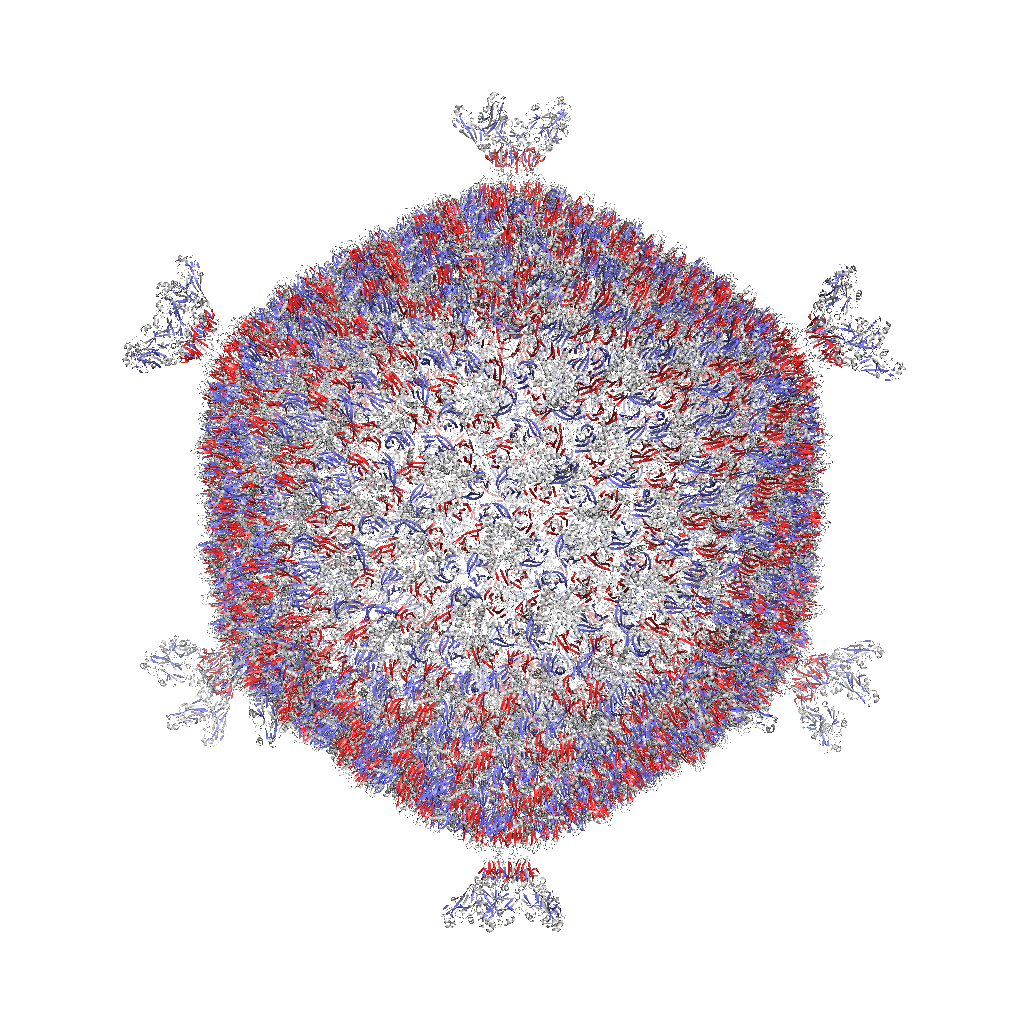
The non-tailed phage Corticovirus

Virions of different families of tailed phages: Myoviridae, Podoviridae and Siphoviridae

For a long time, tailed phages of the order Caudovirales seemed to dominate marine ecosystems in number and diversity of organisms. However, as a result of more recent research, non-tailed viruses appear to dominate multiple depths and oceanic regions. These non-tailed phages also infect marine bacteria, and include the families Corticoviridae, Inoviridae, Microviridae and Autolykiviridae.

As of September 2023, Halomonas phage vB HmeY H4907 is the first virus isolated from the deepest part of the ocean.

== Archaeal viruses ==
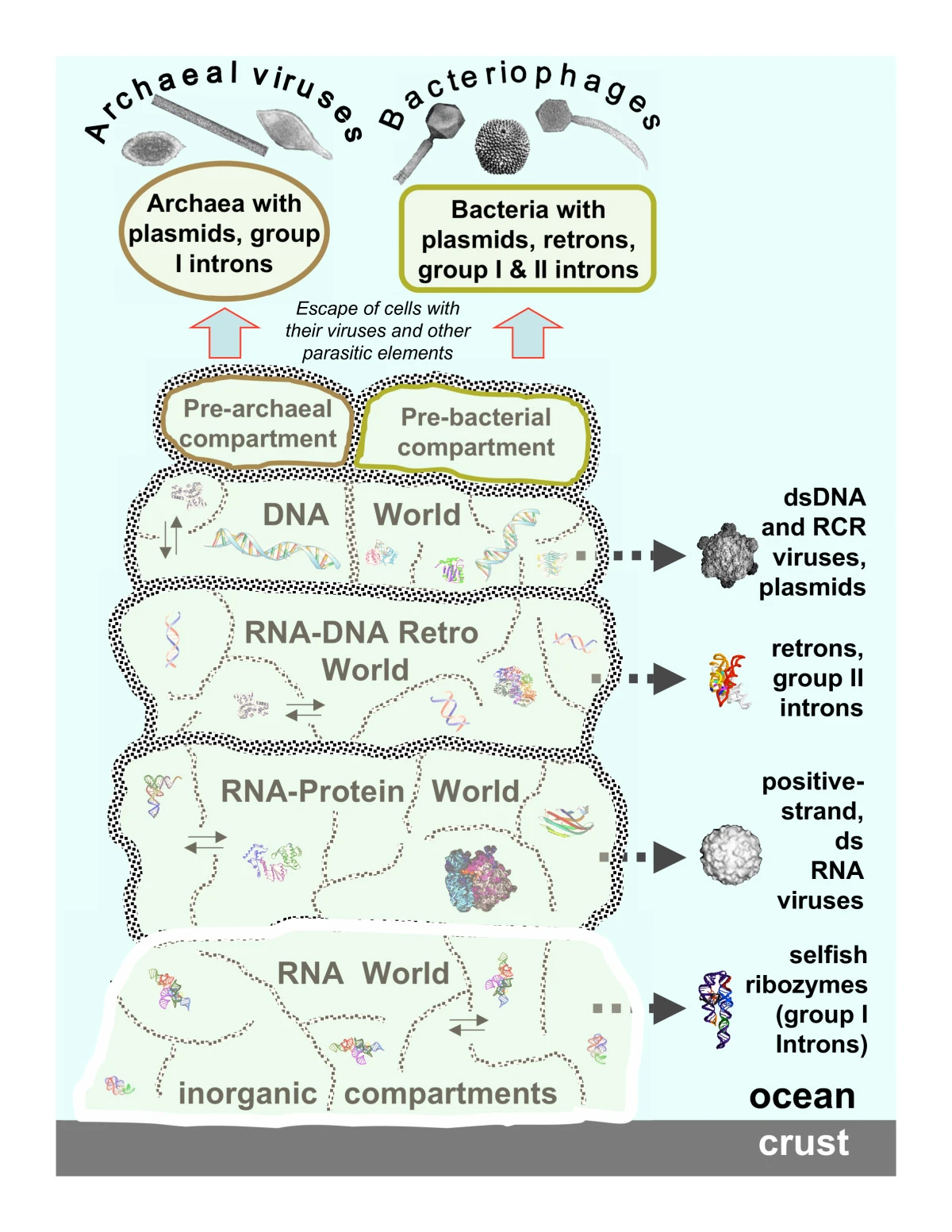
Evolution of the virus world: origin of the main lineages from the primordial gene pool Characteristic images of RNA and protein structures are shown for each postulated stage of evolution, and characteristic virion images are shown for the emerging classes of viruses. Thin arrows show the postulated movement of genetic pools between inorganic compartments. Block arrows show the origin of different classes of viruses at different stages of pre-cellular evolution.

Archaean viruses replicate within archaea: these are double-stranded DNA viruses with unusual and sometimes unique shapes. These viruses have been studied in most detail in the thermophilic archaea, particularly the orders Sulfolobales and Thermoproteales. Defences against these viruses involve RNA interference from repetitive DNA sequences within archaean genomes that are related to the genes of the viruses. Most archaea have CRISPR–Cas systems as an adaptive defence against viruses. These enable archaea to retain sections of viral DNA, which are then used to target and eliminate subsequent infections by the virus using a process similar to RNA interference.

== Fungal viruses ==
Mycoviruses, also known as mycophages, are viruses that infect fungi. The infection of fungal cells is different from that of animal cells. Fungi have a rigid cell wall made of chitin, so most viruses can get inside these cells only after trauma to the cell wall.

- See, Nerva L, Ciuffo M, Vallino M, Margaria P, Varese G, Gnavi G, Turina M (2016). "Multiple approaches for the detection and characterization of viral and plasmid symbionts from a collection of marine fungi". Virus Research. 219: 22–38. doi:10.1016/j.virusres.2015.10.028. hdl:2318/1527617. PMID 26546154. S2CID 53417720.

== Eukaryote viruses ==
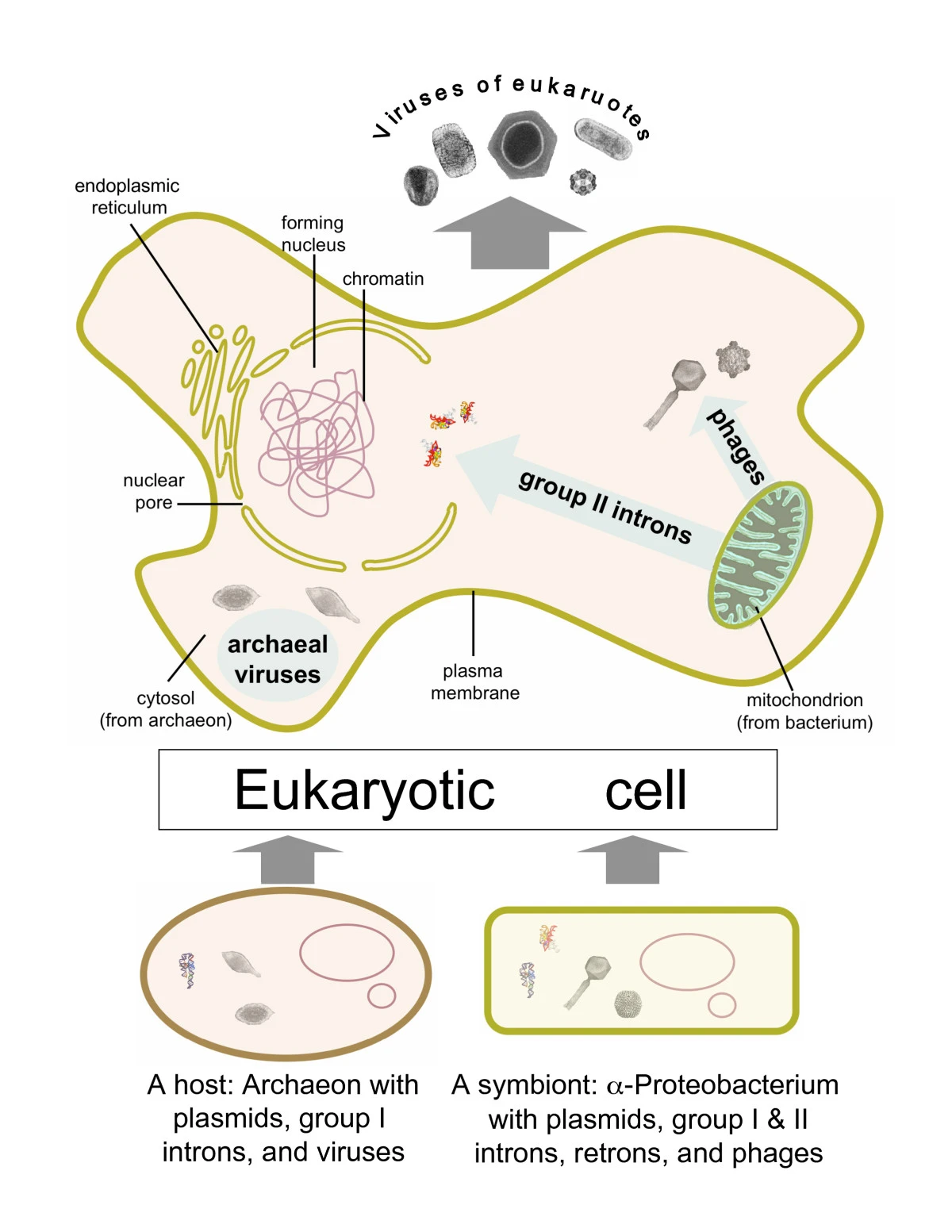
The second melting pot of virus evolution: origin of eukaryotic viruses. Characteristic images of archaeal, bacterial, and eukaryotic viruses are shown.

=== Marine protists ===
By 2015, about 40 viruses affecting marine protists had been isolated and examined, most of them viruses of microalgae. The genomes of these marine protist viruses are highly diverse. Marine algae can be infected by viruses in the family Phycodnaviridae. These are large (100–560 kb) double-stranded DNA viruses with icosahedral shaped capsids. By 2014, 33 species divided into six genera had been identified within the family, which belongs to a super-group of large viruses known as nucleocytoplasmic large DNA viruses. Evidence was published in 2014 suggesting some strains of Phycodnaviridae might infect humans rather than just algal species, as was previously believed. Most genera under this family enter the host cell by cell receptor endocytosis and replicate in the nucleus.

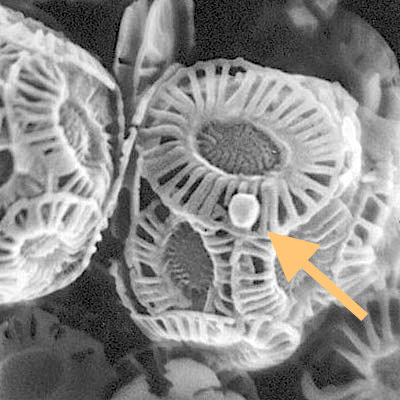
A giant coccolithovirus, Emiliania huxleyi virus 86 (arrowed), infecting an Emiliania huxleyi coccolithophore

Phycodnaviridae play important ecological roles by regulating the growth and productivity of their algal hosts. Algal species such Heterosigma akashiwo and the genus Chrysochromulina can form dense blooms which can be damaging to fisheries, resulting in losses in the aquaculture industry. Heterosigma akashiwo virus (HaV) has been suggested for use as a microbial agent to prevent the recurrence of toxic red tides produced by this algal species. The coccolithovirus Emiliania huxleyi virus 86, a giant double-stranded DNA virus, infects the ubiquitous coccolithophore Emiliania huxleyi. This virus has one of the largest known genomes among marine viruses. Phycodnaviridae cause death and lysis of freshwater and marine algal species, liberating organic carbon, nitrogen and phosphorus into the water, providing nutrients for the microbial loop.

The virus-to-prokaryote ratio, VPR, is often used as an indicator of the relationship between viruses and hosts. Studies have used VPR to indirectly infer virus impact on marine microbial productivity, mortality, and biogeochemical cycling. However, in making these approximations, scientists assume a VPR of 10:1, the median observed VPR in the surface ocean. The actual VPR varies greatly depending on location, so VPR may not be the accurate proxy for viral activity or abundance as it has been treated.

=== Marine invertebrates ===
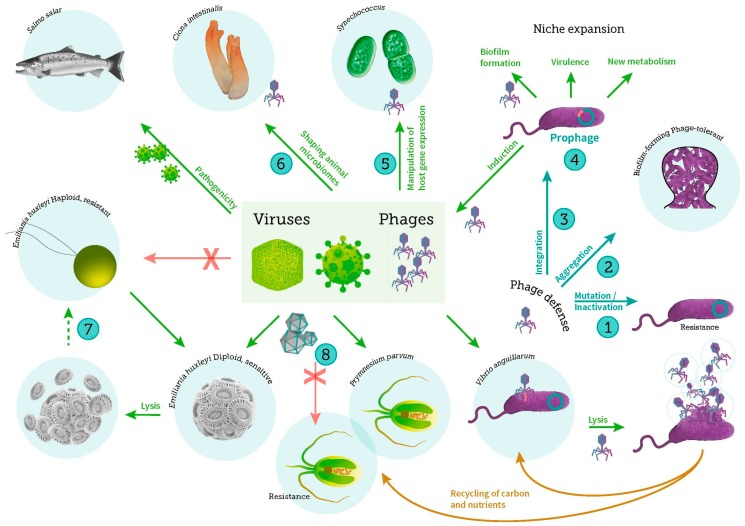
Virus-host interactions in the marine ecosystem, including viral infection of bacteria, phytoplankton and fish

Marine invertebrates are susceptible to viral diseases. Sea star wasting disease is a disease of starfish and several other echinoderms that appears sporadically, causing mass mortality of those affected. There are around 40 different species of sea stars that have been affected by this disease. In 2014 it was suggested that the disease is associated with a single-stranded DNA virus now known as the sea star-associated densovirus (SSaDV); however, sea star wasting disease is not fully understood.

=== Marine vertebrates ===
Fish are particularly prone to infections with rhabdoviruses, which are distinct from, but related to rabies virus. At least nine types of rhabdovirus cause economically important diseases in species including salmon, pike, perch, sea bass, carp and cod. The symptoms include anaemia, bleeding, lethargy and a mortality rate that is affected by the temperature of the water. In hatcheries the diseases are often controlled by increasing the temperature to 15–18 °C (59–64 °F). Like all vertebrates, fish suffer from herpes viruses. These ancient viruses have co-evolved with their hosts and are highly species-specific. In fish, they cause cancerous tumours and non-cancerous growths called hyperplasia.

In 1984, infectious salmon anemia (ISAv) was discovered in Norway in an Atlantic salmon hatchery. Eighty per cent of the fish in the outbreak died. ISAv, a viral disease, is now a major threat to the viability of Atlantic salmon farming. As the name implies, it causes severe anemia of infected fish. Unlike mammals, the red blood cells of fish have DNA and can become infected with viruses. Management strategies include developing a vaccine and improving genetic resistance to the disease.

Marine mammals are also susceptible to marine viral infections. In 1988 and 2002, thousands of harbour seals were killed in Europe by phocine distemper virus. Many other viruses, including caliciviruses, herpesviruses, adenoviruses and parvoviruses, circulate in marine mammal populations.

== Giant marine viruses ==
Most viruses range in length from about 20 to 300 nanometers. This can be contrasted with the length of bacteria, which starts at about 400 nanometers. There are also giant viruses, often called giruses, typically about 1000 nanometers (one micron) in length. All giant viruses belong to the phylum Nucleocytoviricota (NCLDV), together with poxviruses. The largest known of these is Tupanvirus. This genus of giant virus was discovered in 2018 in the deep ocean as well as a soda lake, and can reach up to 2.3 microns in total length.

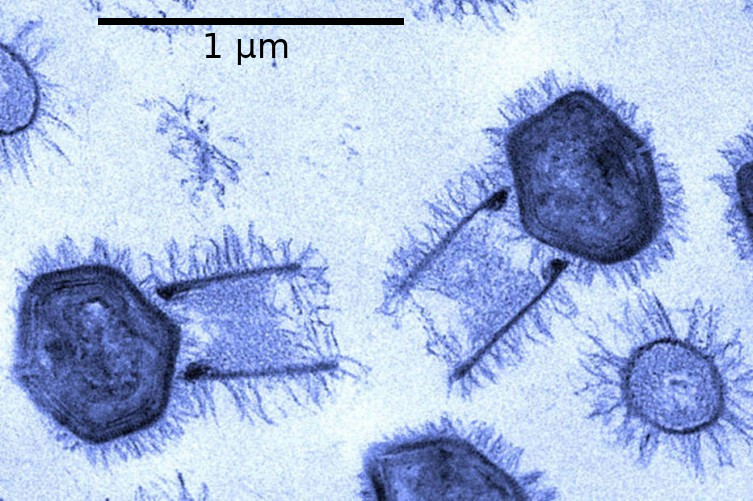
The largest known virus, Tupanvirus, named after Tupã, the Guarani supreme god of creation

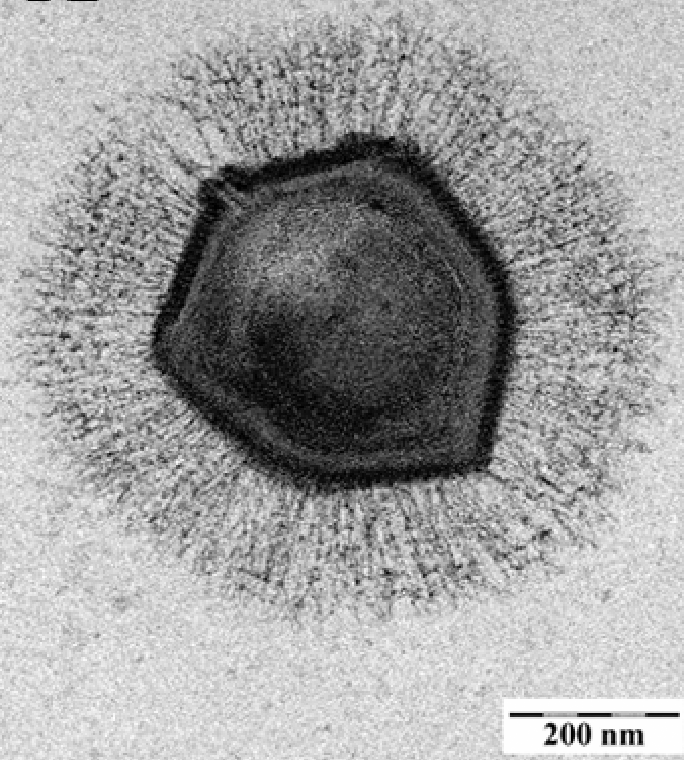
The giant mimivirus

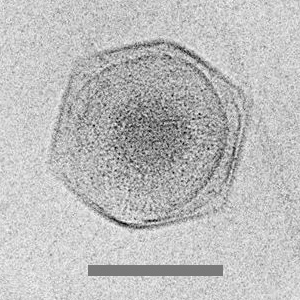
Cryo-electron micrograph of the CroV giant virus
scale bar=0.2 μm

The discovery and subsequent characterization of giant viruses has triggered some debate concerning their evolutionary origins. The two main hypotheses for their origin are that either they evolved from small viruses, picking up DNA from host organisms, or that they evolved from very complicated organisms into the current form which is not self-sufficient for reproduction. What sort of complicated organism giant viruses might have diverged from is also a topic of debate. One proposal is that the origin point actually represents a fourth domain of life, but this has been largely discounted.

== Virophages ==
Virophages are small, double-stranded DNA viruses that rely on the co-infection of giant viruses. Virophages rely on the viral replication factory of the co-infecting giant virus for their own replication. One of the characteristics of virophages is that they have a parasitic relationship with the co-infecting virus. Their dependence upon the giant virus for replication often results in the deactivation of the giant viruses. The virophage may improve the recovery and survival of the host organism. Unlike other satellite viruses, virophages have a parasitic effect on their co-infecting virus. Virophages have been observed to render a giant virus inactive and thereby improve the condition of the host organism.

All known virophages are grouped into the family Lavidaviridae (from "large virus dependent or associated" + -viridae). The first virophage was discovered in a cooling tower in Paris in 2008. It was discovered with its co-infecting giant virus, Acanthamoeba castellanii mamavirus (ACMV). The virophage was named Sputnik and its replication relied entirely on the co-infection of ACMV and its cytoplasmic replication machinery. Sputnik was also discovered to have an inhibitory effect on ACMV and improved the survival of the host. Other characterised virophages include Sputnik 2, Sputnik 3, Zamilon and Mavirus.

Most of these virophages were discovered by analyzing metagenomic data sets. In metagenomic analysis, DNA sequences are run through multiple bioinformatic algorithms which pull out certain important patterns and characteristics. In these data sets are giant viruses and virophages. They are separated by looking for sequences around 17 to 20 kbp long which have similarities to already sequenced virophages. These virophages can have linear or circular double-stranded DNA genomes. Virophages in culture have icosahedral capsid particles that measure around 40 to 80 nanometers long. Virophage particles are so small that electron microscopy must be used to view these particles. Metagenomic sequence-based analyses have been used to predict around 57 complete and partial virophage genomes and in December 2019 to identify 328 high-quality (complete or near-complete) genomes from diverse habitats including the human gut, plant rhizosphere, and terrestrial subsurface, from 27 distinct taxonomic clades.

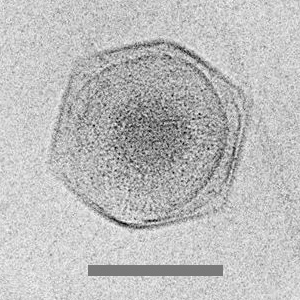
The giant virus CroV attacks C. roenbergensis.

Cafeteria roenbergensis, a bacterivorous marine flagellate

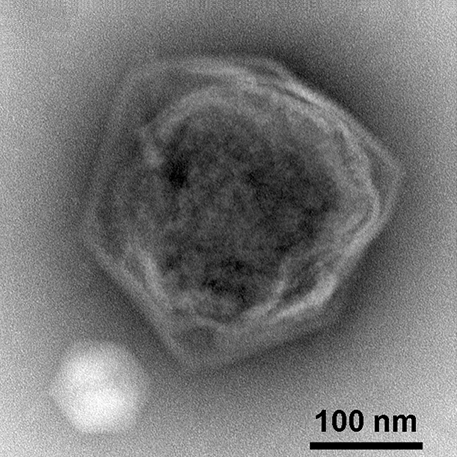
A Mavirus virophage (lower left) alongside a giant CroV

A giant marine virus CroV infects and causes the death by lysis of the marine zooflagellate Cafeteria roenbergensis. This impacts coastal ecology because Cafeteria roenbergensis feeds on bacteria found in the water. When there are low numbers of Cafeteria roenbergensis due to extensive CroV infections, the bacterial populations rise exponentially. The impact of CroV on natural populations of C. roenbergensis remains unknown; however, the virus has been found to be very host specific, and does not infect other closely related organisms. Cafeteria roenbergensis is also infected by a second virus, the Mavirus virophage, during co-infection with CroV. This virus interferes with the replication of CroV, which leads to the survival of C. roenbergensis cells. Mavirus is able to integrate into the genome of cells of C. roenbergensis and thereby confer immunity to the population.

== Role of marine viruses ==
Although marine viruses have only recently been studied extensively, they are already known to hold critical roles in many ecosystem functions and cycles. Marine viruses offer a number of important ecosystem services and are essential to the regulation of marine ecosystems. Marine bacteriophages and other viruses appear to influence biogeochemical cycles globally, provide and regulate microbial biodiversity, cycle carbon through marine food webs, and are essential in preventing bacterial population explosions.

=== Viral shunt ===
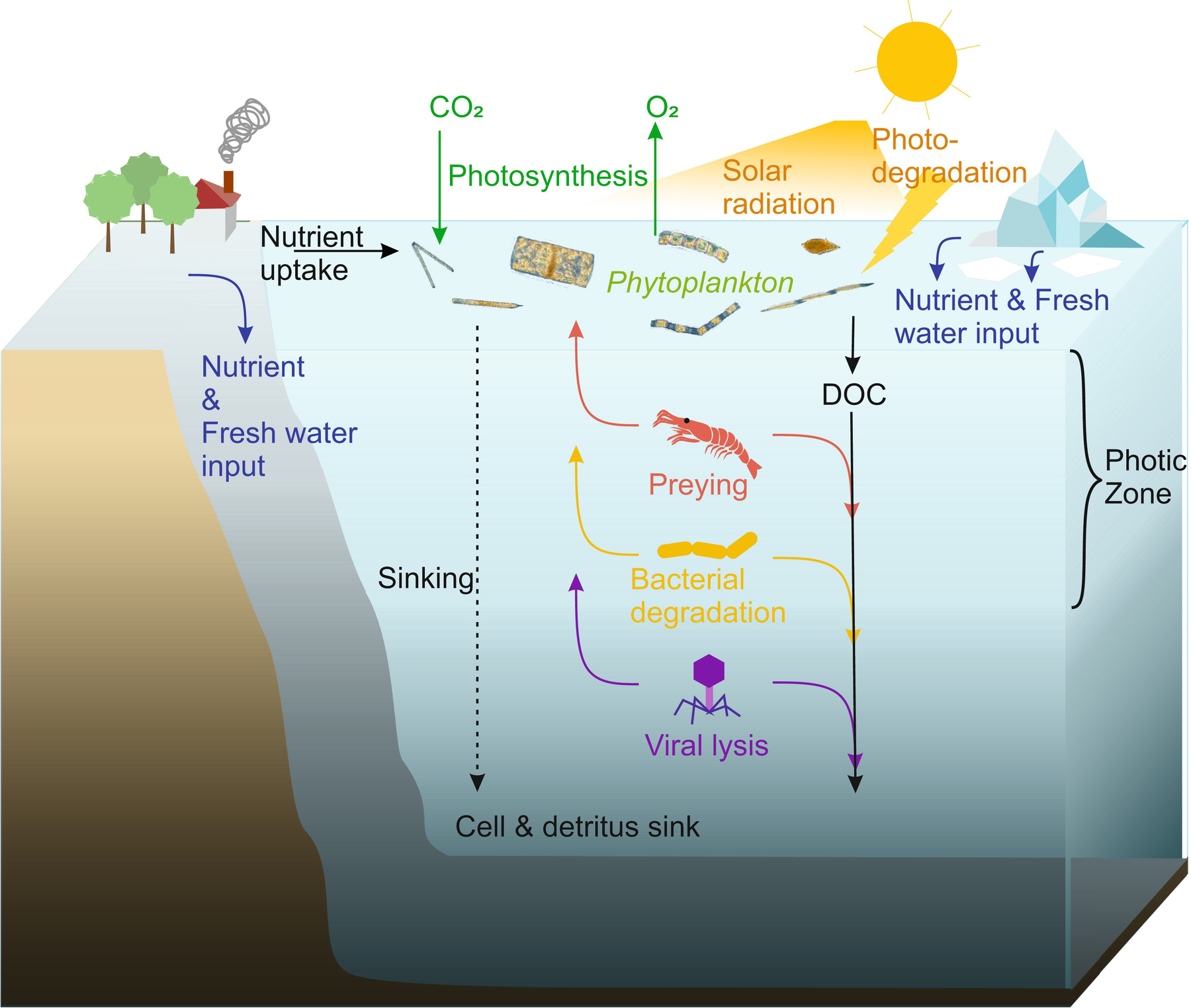
The cycling of marine phytoplankton is helped by viral lysis.

The dominant hosts for viruses in the ocean are marine microorganisms, such as bacteria. Bacteriophages are harmless to plants and animals, and are essential to the regulation of marine and freshwater ecosystems are important mortality agents of phytoplankton, the base of the foodchain in aquatic environments. They infect and destroy bacteria in aquatic microbial communities, and are one of the most important mechanisms of recycling carbon and nutrient cycling in marine environments. The organic molecules released from the dead bacterial cells stimulate fresh bacterial and algal growth, in a process known as the viral shunt.

In this way, marine viruses are thought to play an important role in nutrient cycles by increasing the efficiency of the biological pump. Viruses cause lysis of living cells, that is, they break the cell membranes down. This releases compounds such as amino acids and nucleic acids, which tend to be recycled near the surface.

Viral activity also enhances the ability of the biological pump to sequester carbon in the deep ocean. Lysis releases more indigestible carbon-rich material like that found in cell walls, which is likely exported to deeper waters. Thus, the material that is exported to deeper waters by the viral shunt is probably more carbon rich than the material from which it was derived. By increasing the amount of respiration in the oceans, viruses are indirectly responsible for reducing the amount of carbon dioxide in the atmosphere by about three gigatonnes of carbon per year. Lysis of bacteria by viruses has been shown to also enhance nitrogen cycling and stimulate phytoplankton growth.

The viral shunt pathway is a mechanism that prevents (prokaryotic and eukaryotic) marine microbial particulate organic matter (POM) from migrating up trophic levels by recycling them into dissolved organic matter (DOM), which can be readily taken up by microorganisms. Viral shunting helps maintain diversity within the microbial ecosystem by preventing a single species of marine microbe from dominating the micro-environment. The DOM recycled by the viral shunt pathway is comparable to the amount generated by the other main sources of marine DOM.

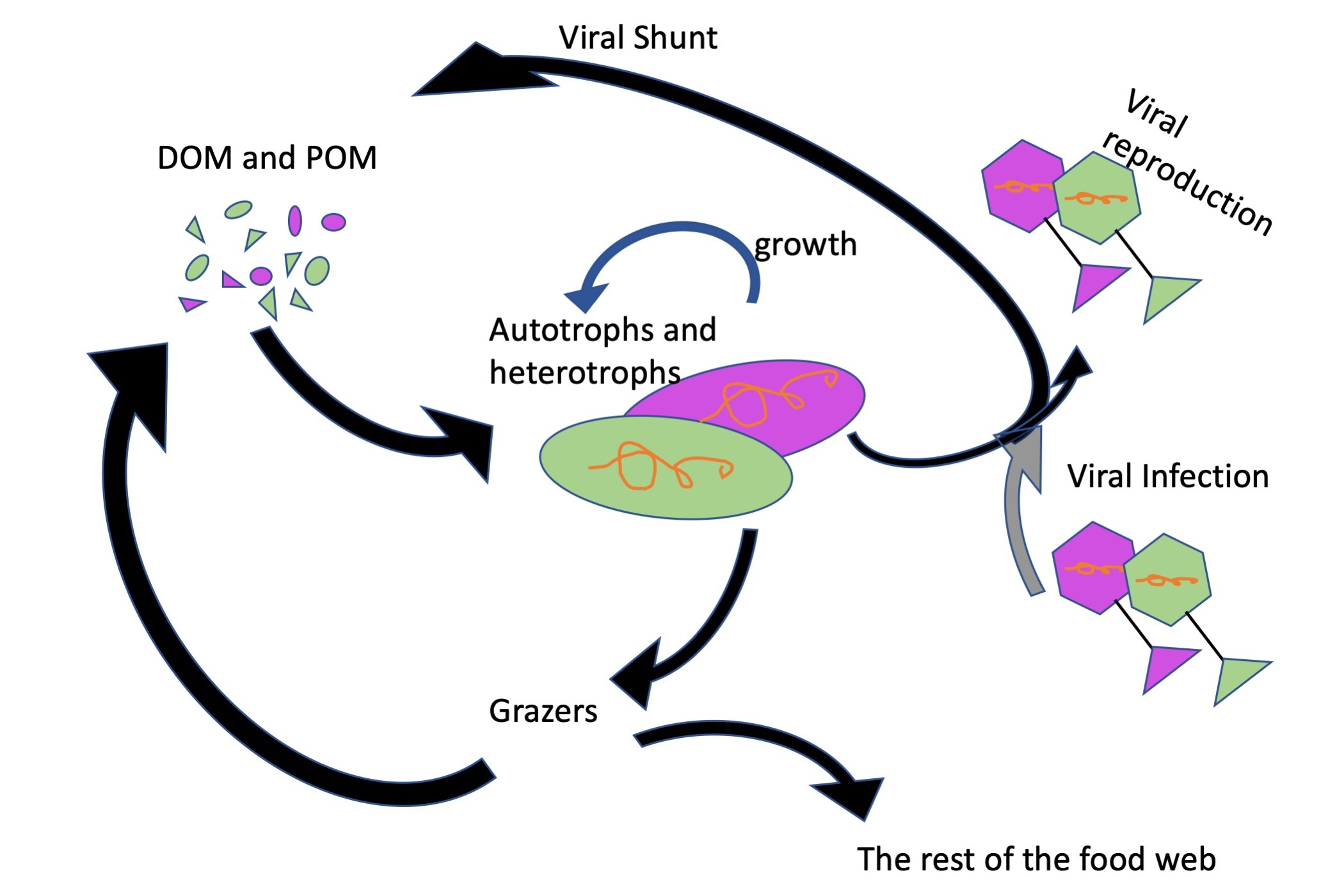
The viral shunt pathway facilitates the flow of dissolved organic matter (DOM) and particulate organic matter (POM) through the marine food web.

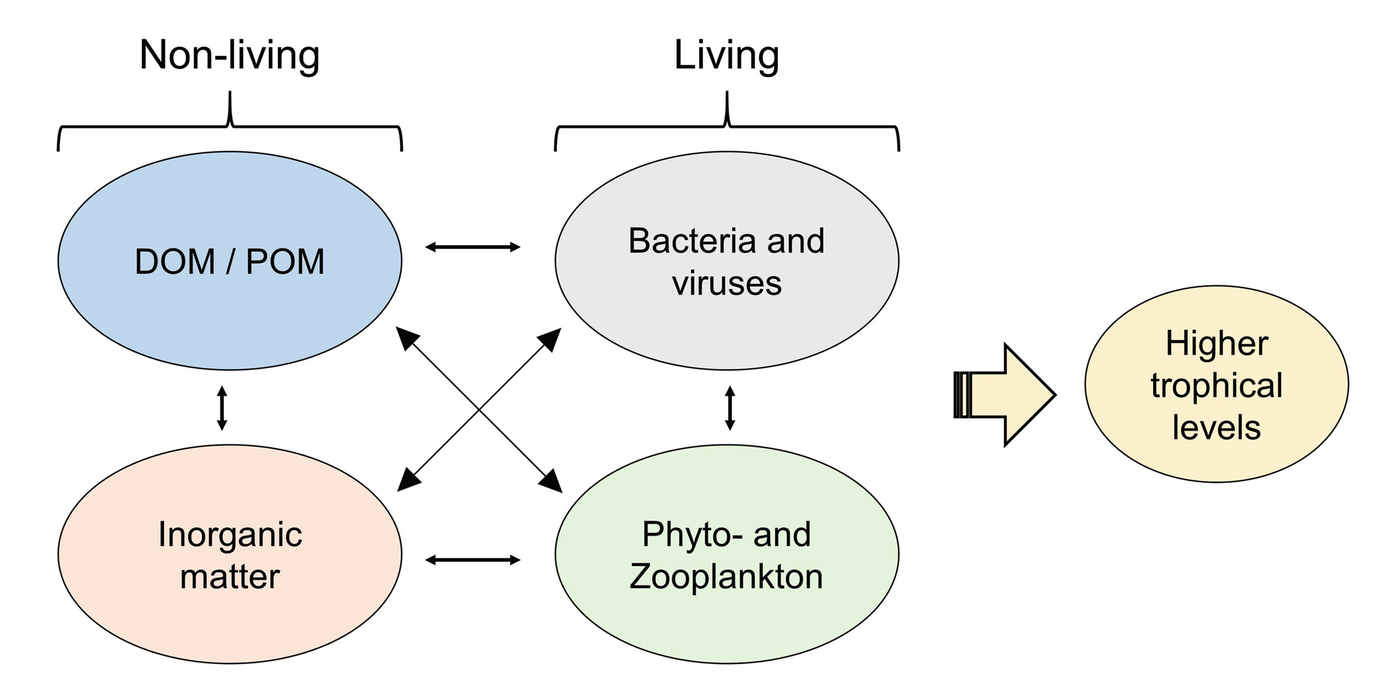
Connections between the different compartments of the living (bacteria/viruses and phytoplankton/zooplankton) and the nonliving (DOM/POM and inorganic matter) environment

Viruses are the most abundant biological entity in marine environments. On average there are about ten million of them in one milliliter of seawater. Most of these viruses are bacteriophages infecting heterotrophic bacteria and cyanophages infecting cyanobacteria. Viruses easily infect microorganisms in the microbial loop due to their relative abundance compared to microbes. Prokaryotic and eukaryotic mortality contribute to carbon nutrient recycling through cell lysis. There is evidence as well of nitrogen (specifically ammonium) regeneration. This nutrient recycling helps stimulates microbial growth. As much as 25% of the primary production from phytoplankton in the global oceans may be recycled within the microbial loop through viral shunting.

=== Regulating the carbon cycle ===
Viruses act as "regulators" of the global carbon cycle because they impact the material cycles and energy flows of food webs and the microbial loop. The average contribution of viruses to the Earth ecosystem carbon cycle is 8.6%, of which its contribution to marine ecosystems (1.4%) is less than its contribution to terrestrial (6.7%) and freshwater (17.8%) ecosystems. Over the past 2,000 years, anthropogenic activities and climate change have gradually altered the regulatory role of viruses in ecosystem carbon cycling processes. This has been particularly conspicuous over the past 200 years due to rapid industrialization and the attendant population growth.

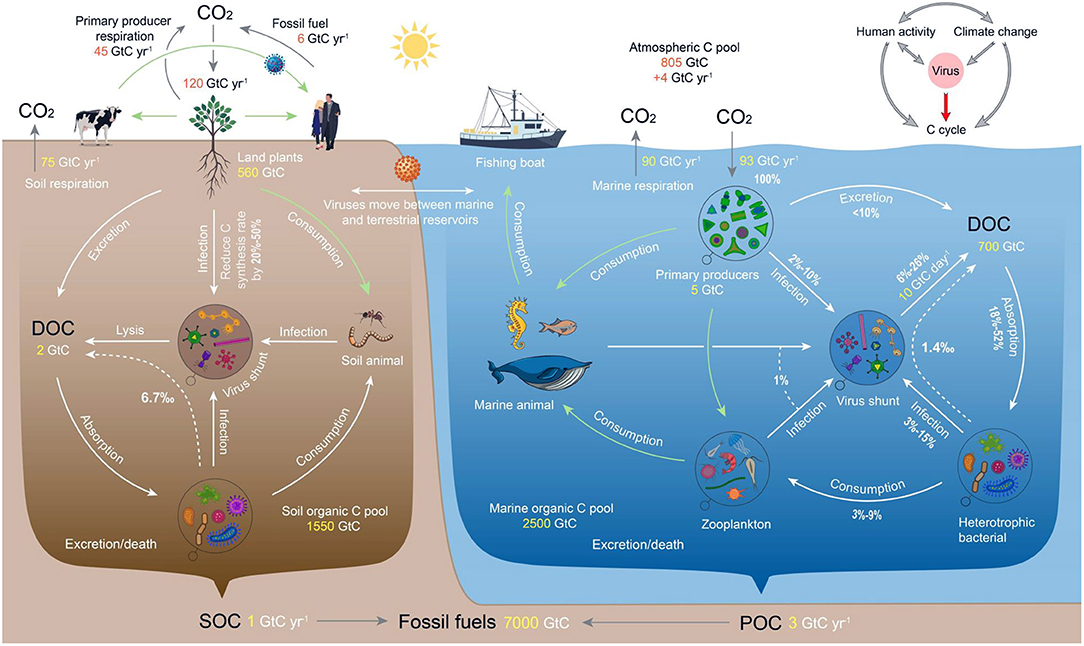
Comparison of how virus regulate the carbon cycle in terrestrial ecosystems (left) and in marine ecosystems (right). Arrows show the roles viruses play in the traditional food web, the microbial loop and the carbon cycle. Light green arrows represent the traditional food web, white arrows represent the microbial loop, and white dotted arrows represent the contribution rate of carbon produced by viral lysing of bacteria to the ecosystem dissolved organic carbon (DOC) pool. Freshwater ecosystems are regulated in a manner similar to marine ecosystems, and are not shown separately. The microbial loop is an important supplement to the classic food chain, wherein dissolved organic matter is ingested by heterotrophic "planktonic" bacteria during secondary production. These bacteria are then consumed by protozoa, copepods and other organisms, and eventually returned to the classical food chain.

=== Limiting algal blooms ===
Microorganisms make up about 70% of the marine biomass. It is estimated viruses kill 20% of the microorganism biomass each day and that there are 15 times as many viruses in the oceans as there are bacteria and archaea. Viruses are the main agents responsible for the rapid destruction of harmful algal blooms, which often kill other marine life. Scientists are exploring the potential of marine cyanophages to be used to prevent or reverse eutrophication. The number of viruses in the oceans decreases further offshore and deeper into the water, where there are fewer host organisms.

=== Gene transfer ===
Marine bacteriophages often contain auxiliary metabolic genes, host-derived genes thought to sustain viral replication by supplementing host metabolism during viral infection. These genes can impact multiple biogeochemical cycles, including carbon, phosphorus, sulfur, and nitrogen.

Viruses are an important natural means of transferring genes between different species, which increases genetic diversity and drives evolution. It is thought viruses played a central role in early evolution, before bacteria, archaea and eukaryotes diversified, at the time of the last universal common ancestor of life on Earth. Viruses are still one of the largest reservoirs of unexplored genetic diversity on Earth.

== Marine habitats ==
=== Along the coast ===
Marine coastal habitats sit at the interface between the land and the ocean. It is likely that RNA viruses play significant roles in these environments.

=== At the ocean surface ===
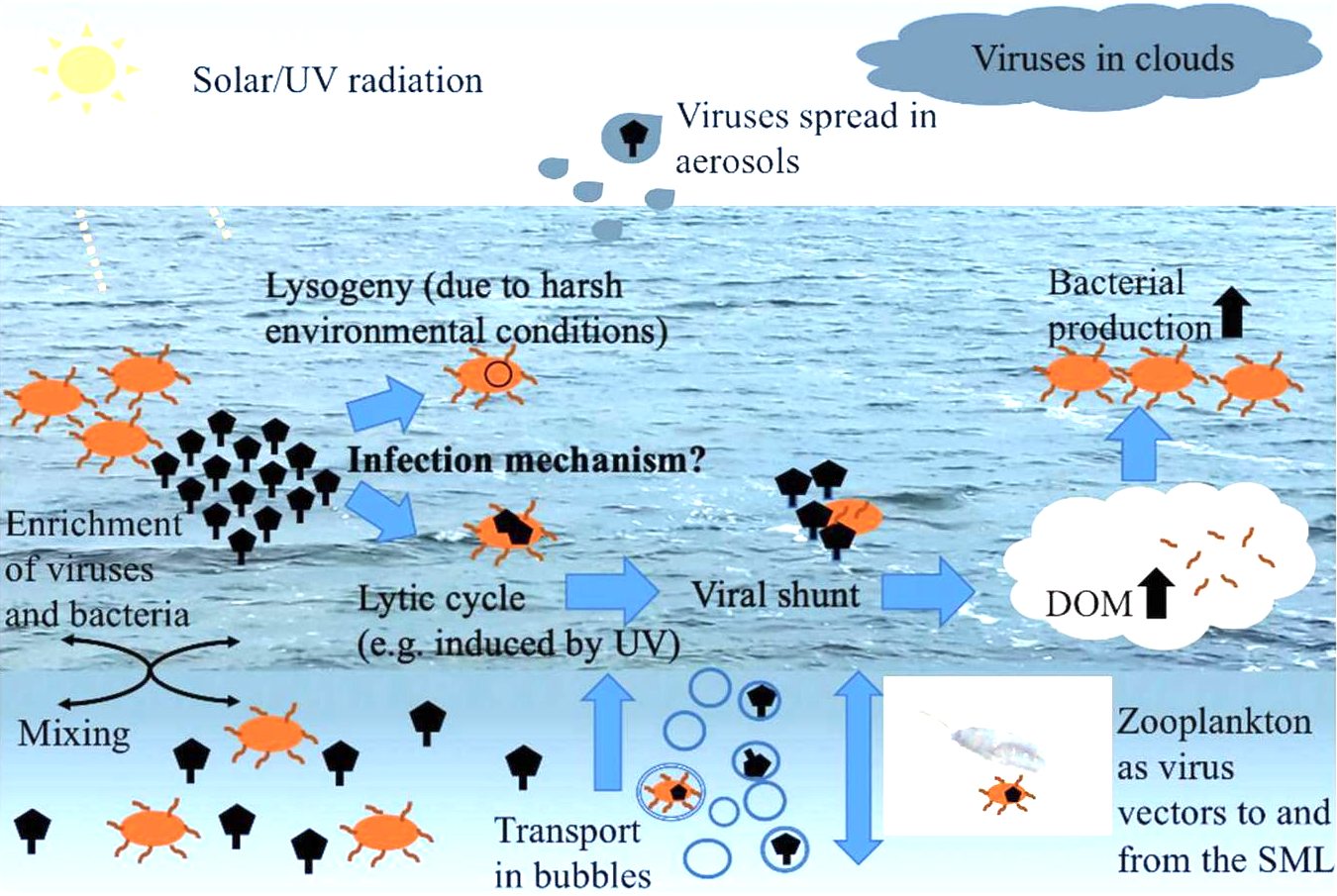
Viral–bacterial dynamics in the surface microlayer (SML) of the ocean and beyond. DOM = dissolved organic matter, UV = ultraviolet.

Marine surface habitats sit at the interface between the atmosphere and the ocean. The biofilm-like habitat at the surface of the ocean harbours surface-dwelling microorganisms, commonly referred to as neuston. Viruses in the microlayer, the so-called virioneuston, have recently become of interest to researchers as enigmatic biological entities in the boundary surface layers with potentially important ecological impacts. Given this vast air–water interface sits at the intersection of major air–water exchange processes spanning more than 70% of the global surface area, it is likely to have profound implications for marine biogeochemical cycles, on the microbial loop and gas exchange, as well as the marine food web structure, the global dispersal of airborne viruses originating from the sea surface microlayer, and human health.

=== In the water column ===
Viruses in the marine water column are too small to be able to counter the motion of ocean currents. They must drift at the mercy of the currents, and consequentially are classified amongst the plankton (from the Greek planktos (πλαγκτός), meaning "drifter" or "wanderer").

These planktonic viruses are also known as virioplankton.

Marine viral activity presents a potential explanation of the paradox of the plankton proposed by George Hutchinson in 1961. The paradox of the plankton is that many plankton species have been identified in small regions in the ocean where limited resources should create competitive exclusion, limiting the number of coexisting species. Marine viruses could play a role in this effect, as viral infection increases as potential contact with hosts increases. Viruses could therefore control the populations of plankton species that grow too abundant, allowing a wide diversity of species to coexist.

=== In sediments ===
Marine bacteriophages play an important role in deep sea ecosystems. There are between 5 × 10^{12} and 1 × 10^{13} phages per square metre in deep sea sediments and their abundance closely correlates with the number of prokaryotes found in the sediments. They are responsible for the death of 80% of the prokaryotes found in the sediments, and almost all of these deaths are caused by cell lysis (bursting). This allows nitrogen, carbon, and phosphorus from the living cells to be converted into dissolved organic matter and detritus, contributing to the high rate of nutrient turnover in deep sea sediments. Because of the importance of deep sea sediments in biogeochemical cycles, marine bacteriophages influence the carbon, nitrogen and phosphorus cycles. More research needs to be done to more precisely elucidate these influences.

=== In hydrothermal vents ===
Viruses are part of the hydrothermal vent microbial community and their influence on the microbial ecology in these ecosystems is a burgeoning field of research. Viruses are the most abundant life in the ocean, harboring the greatest reservoir of genetic diversity. As their infections are often fatal, they constitute a significant source of mortality and thus have widespread influence on biological oceanographic processes, evolution and biogeochemical cycling within the ocean. Evidence has been found however to indicate that viruses found in vent habitats have adopted a more mutualistic than parasitic evolutionary strategy in order to survive the extreme and volatile environment they exist in. Deep-sea hydrothermal vents were found to have high numbers of viruses indicating high viral production. Like in other marine environments, deep-sea hydrothermal viruses affect abundance and diversity of prokaryotes and therefore impact microbial biogeochemical cycling by lysing their hosts to replicate. However, in contrast to their role as a source of mortality and population control, viruses have also been postulated to enhance survival of prokaryotes in extreme environments, acting as reservoirs of genetic information. The interactions of the virosphere with microorganisms under environmental stresses is therefore thought to aide microorganism survival through dispersal of host genes through horizontal gene transfer.

=== Polar regions ===
In addition to varied topographies and in spite of an extremely cold climate, the polar aquatic regions are teeming with microbial life. Even in sub-glacial regions, cellular life has adapted to these extreme environments where perhaps there are traces of early microbes on Earth. As grazing by macrofauna is limited in most of these polar regions, viruses are being recognised for their role as important agents of mortality, thereby influencing the biogeochemical cycling of nutrients that, in turn, impact community dynamics at seasonal and spatial scales. The polar regions are characterised by truncated food webs, and the role of viruses in ecosystem function is likely to be even greater than elsewhere in the marine food web, yet their diversity is still relatively under-explored, and the way in which they affect polar communities is not well understood, particularly in nutrient cycling.

=== Distribution ===
Viruses are highly host specific. A marine virus is more likely to infect cooccurring organisms, those that live in the same region the virus lives in. Therefore, biogeography is an important factor in a virion's ability to infect.

Knowledge of this variation in viral populations across spatiotemporal and other environmental gradients is supported by viral morphology, as determined by transmission electron microscopy (TEM). Non-tailed viruses appear to be dominant in multiple depths and oceanic regions, followed by the Caudovirales myoviruses, podoviruses, and siphoviruses. However, viruses belonging to families Corticoviridae, Inoviridae and Microviridae are also known to infect diverse marine bacteria. Metagenomic evidence suggests that microviruses (icosahedral ssDNA phages) are particularly prevalent in marine habitats.

Metagenomic approaches to assess viral diversity are often limited by a lack of reference sequences, leaving many sequences unannotated. However, viral contigs are generated through direct sequencing of a viral fraction, typically generated after 0.02-um filtration of a marine water sample, or through bioinformatics approaches to identify viral contigs or viral genomes from a microbial metagenome. Novel tools to identify putative viral contigs, such as VirSorter and VirFinder, allow for the assessment of patterns of viral abundance, host range, and functional content of marine bacteriophage.

== See also ==
- Human viruses in water
- Varidnaviria
