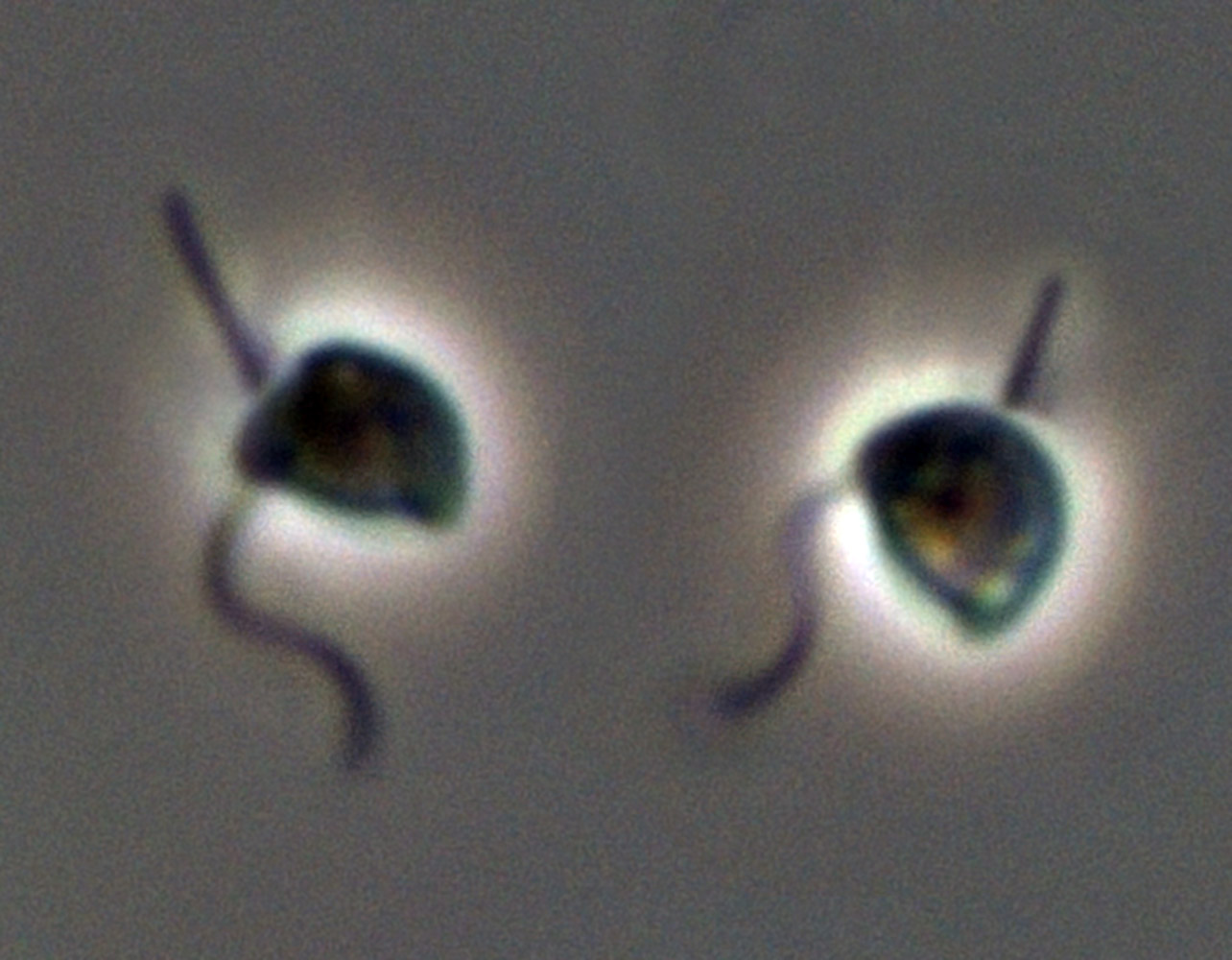
- Cafeteria roenbergensis cells under light micrograph

Scientific classification
- Domain: Eukaryota
- Supergroup: Stramenopiles
- Phylum: Bigyra
- Order: Bicosoecida
- Family: Cafeteriaceae
- Genus: Cafeteria; Fenchel & Patterson, 1988

Type species
- Cafeteria roenbergensis Fenchel & Patterson, 1988

Synonyms
- Acronema Teal et al. 1998 non Falconer ex Edgeworth 1846

= Cafeteria (genus) =

Genus of single-celled organisms

Cafeteria is a genus of single-celled heterotrophic eukaryotes first described in 1988. The genus is found worldwide and in mostly marine, though sometimes brackish, waters. There are 14 described species of Cafeteria, the most abundant species being C. burkhardae which has a cosmopolitan distribution. Cafeteria are prominent contributors in marine microbe food webs as both predator and prey, and are important model organisms for microbial grazing studies and virophage research, due to interactions between its associated C. roenbergensis virus and Mavirus.

== Classification ==
Cafeteria was first described by marine ecologist Tom Fenchel and taxonomist David J. Patterson in 1988, after it was observed in a surface water sample collected from the Limfjord, Denmark. A flagellate with 2 subapical flagella on a flattened/depressed ventral face, its feeding apparatus and strategy are characteristic of bicosoecids. However, with it lacking the lorica of the genus Bicosoeca, and the mucus excretion and collar of the genus Pseudobodo, a new genus of bicosoecid was defined. It was given the name Cafeteria to reflect its importance in marine microbial food webs.

=== Taxonomy ===
Due to their shared aloricate nature, Cafeteria and Pseudobodo were previously grouped together as the family Cafeteriaceae, though more insight into the relationships between bicosoecids has removed Pseudobodo from this family. As of 2026 Cafeteria’s recognized sister genera in the family Cafeteriaceae are Symbiomonas, and Anoeca. These genera have one currently accepted species each. Symbiomonas scintillins shares a flagellar root structure and other ultrastructural features with Cafeteria, as well as being phylogenetically closely related, though it only has one flagellum. Anoeca atlantica is morphologically similar to Cafeteria but genetically distinct; their shared cell shape may be the ancestral state lost in Symbiomonas.

A fourth Cafeteriaceae genus Acronema was described in 1988 with one species, Acronema sippewissettensis. In 2013 this species was reassigned as Cafeteria sippewissettensis as it was determined to be not distinct enough to warrant its own genus. The use of the name Acronema for this genus was also invalid as it is already being used for a genus of a plant in the family Apiaceae. For these reasons Acronema is no longer used in Cafeteriaceae and is now considered a synonym of Cafeteria.

=== Species classification ===
Upon its initial description in 1988, only one species was attributed to the genus Cafeteria - its type species Cafeteria roenbergensis. Three additional species of Cafeteria were described in 1990: Cafeteria ligulifera, Cafeteria marsupialis, and Cafeteria minuta (reclassification; formerly Pseudobodo minutus). C. marsupialis was later reclassified as the lone member of a new genus Cantina (Cantina marsupialis) after phylogenetic analysis found it to be genetically distant from other Cafeteria samples.

For many years taxonomic identification of Cafeteria was made based on cultivated strains, sequencing of which typically assigned them to C. roenbergensis. While Cafeteria was commonly found in plankton samples worldwide, it was less commonly identified to species. When it was given a species classification, comparison to the cultivated strains commonly led samples to be identified as C. roenbergensis. Though, descriptions of these C. roenbergensis samples included notable morphological variation that was hypothesized as ecological variants of the species, or new species altogether.

Cafeteria sp. (cf. roenbergensis or burkhardae) in phase contrast micrograph (c) with labeled illustration (g), alongside other nanoflagellates: Paraphysomonas foraminifera (a and e), Pteridomonas danica (b and f), and Pseudobodo cf. tremulans. Scale bar = 5 μm.

In 2020 an extensive overview of the diversity of Cafeteria was published describing morphology and phylogenetic relationships within the genus, using 29 cultivated strains of Cafeteria collected from diverse marine habitats around the world. Morphological variation alone was not enough to decisively classify these strains, but genetic analysis of rDNA genes was used to group these strains into 8 unique species, including 6 novel species. Notably, this study found that many sequences that had previously been assigned to the type species C. roenbergensis had been misidentified and actually belonged to the newly described species Cafeteria burkhardae. This changed the understanding of the distribution of species within this genus as now it is C. burkhardae that is understood to be the most common species rather than C. roenbergensis. A follow-up study in 2022 examined 10 new strains of Cafeteria and identified 3 additional novel Cafeteria species.

Prior to these reclassifications, research involving Cafeteria was done on cultured strains that had been identified as C. roenbergensis; retrospectively it is likely that these were actually C. burkhardae or possibly another Cafeteria species, and thus results of these studies should not be taken as being unique to the species C. roenbergensis.

=== Species list ===
- Cafeteria atacamiensis Schoenle & Arndt, 2021
- Cafeteria baltica Hohlfeld & Sachs, 2021
- Cafeteria biegae Schoenle & Arndt, 2020
- Cafeteria burkhardae Schoenle & Arndt, 2020
- Cafeteria chilensis Filz, Nitsche & Arndt, 2020
- Cafeteria graefeae Schoenle & Arndt, 2020
- Cafeteria ligulifera Larsen & Patterson, 1990
- Cafeteria loberiensis Filz, Nitsche & Arndt, 2020
- Cafeteria maldiviensis Schoenle, Rosse & Arndt, 2020
- Cafeteria minuta (Ruinen) Larsen & Patterson, 1990
- Cafeteria mylnikovii Cavalier-Smith & Chao, 2006
- Cafeteria paulosalfera Schoenle & Rybarski, 2021
- Cafeteria roenbergensis Fenchel & Patterson, 1988
- Cafeteria sippewissettensis (Teal, Guillemette, Chapman & Margulis) Cavalier-Smith 2013

== Morphology ==
=== Cell shape ===
Schematic illustration of a Cafeteria roenbergensis cell.

Cafeteria cells are colourless, aloricate nanoflagellates. They are often described as “kidney-shaped” or “D-shaped”, a result of having a convex dorsal side and flat or concave ventral side. The ventral side of the cell can also be identified by a furrow, used for feeding, that varies in shape and position between species. Cells are typically 3-6 μm long and compressed laterally, though size and shape varies and may be temporarily distorted after ingesting food. The left side of the cell often extends towards the anterior end of the cell; the “shelf” structure that this forms can be used to distinguish between difference species of Cafeteria.

=== Flagella and feeding apparatus ===
Cafeteria, like other stramenopiles, has 2 apical flagella- one is anteriorly oriented and lined by stiff, tripartite hairs, and the second is posteriorly oriented and hairless. The flagella are typically in the range of 5-8 μm in length and may be equal or unequal in length, depending on the species. These flagella along with cytoskeletal components form a feeding apparatus that is characteristic of bicosoecids, though a forked rhizoplast connecting the posterior flagella to the nucleus observed in C. roenbergensis has not been observed in other bicosoecids.

Though stramenopiles are derived from a photosynthetic common ancestor, Cafeteria is not photosynthetic and bears no evidence of possessing a chloroplast. Instead, as heterotrophic cells they obtain energy and nutrients by consuming other organisms using the feeding apparatus described above. The bicosoecid feeding apparatus is comparable to the feeding basket of chrysophytes in the order Chromulinales. While both groups are stramenopiles, chrysophytes are notably photosynthetic while bicosoecids are not. Whether these feeding structures are homologous or not is unclear. In Cafeteria the cytostome is located at the base of the feeding apparatus; Cafeteria cells lack a cytopharynx.

=== Ultrastructure ===
Cafeteria cells have one anteriorly and centrally located nucleus, a diploid genome, and mitochondria with tubular cristae. Early accounts of Cafeteria cells describe the cell being lined with extrusomes, particularly dense near the feeding apparatus on the anterior end of C. roenbergensis. With updated classification within the genus, the only species currently recognized to bear extrusomes is Cafeteria chilensis. Extrusomes were not observed on any other species, including C. roenbergensis.

== Ecology ==
=== Reproduction ===
Cafeteria cells reproduce asexually by binary fission. Sexual reproduction has not been observed in the genus, though it is implied. The increasing understanding of the Cafeteria genome via shotgun sequencing studies may be able to reveal more information as to the mechanics of sexual reproduction in this genus.

=== Feeding and Diet ===
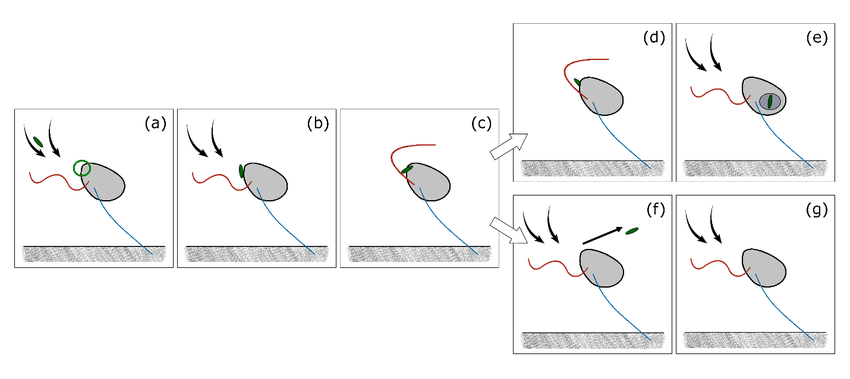
Schematic of foraging by Cafeteria cells, showing prey capture (a-c), followed by prey ingestion (d-e) or prey rejection (f-g). The anterior flagellum (red) moves rapidly to create a current (indicated by curved arrows) to draw the food particle towards the ventral furrow (green) for ingestion, while the posterior flagellum (blue) keeps the cell anchored to substrate.

Cafeteria cells use their feeding apparatus to ingest food by whipping the hairy, anteriorly oriented flagellum in the surrounding water to create a current. This current draws food particles towards the furrow on the ventral side of the cell to be consumed. The anteriorly oriented flagellum beats in rapid, asymmetrical, wave-like motions such that the base and tip of it remain in place while its length oscillates, though the speed of this oscillation makes it hard to observe its wave form. In the meantime, the posteriorly oriented hairless flagellum is used by the cell to attach to a substrate. While not feeding, the cell may detach from the substrate and move through the water, leading with its anteriorly oriented flagellum and its posteriorly oriented flagellum trailing behind.

Cafeteria are prolific bacterivores and play a significant role as heterotrophic nanoflagellate grazers in marine food webs. Grazers exert top-down population control of bacteria in marine ecosystems by reducing the abundance of bacteria. In the process of ingesting these cells, some nutrients may leak back into the surrounding environment due to ‘sloppy eating’, making these nutrients available for re-uptake by other bacteria. Thus, while grazing by heterotrophic nanoflagellate grazers puts a limit on the size of bacteria populations, the cycling of nutrients in this process helps to support bacteria populations at the same time. Cafeteria, as a dominant group of heterotrophic nanoflagellates in oceans around the world, are some of the main contributors to this control on bacterial populations in the ocean and are therefore important to supporting the lower trophic levels of the food chain.

In addition to being important consumers in the marine microbial ecosystem, Cafeteria are also prey to larger heterotrophic eukaryotes such as dinoflagellates. Similar to how bacteria populations are top-down controlled by heterotrophic nanoflagellates like Cafeteria, Cafeteria is top-down controlled by heterotrophic dinoflagellates. Because not all dinoflagellates feed on nanoflagellates like Cafeteria, the presence or absence, and abundance, of Cafeteria in an ecosystem can have an effect on the diversity and abundance of dinoflagellates as well. As a genus that plays a significant role both as consumer and as prey, Cafeteria is important to the bacteria/heterotrophic nanoflagellate/heterotrophic dinoflagellate food chain, and on a wider scale is an important element of the marine microbial loop, transferring carbon and nutrients to higher trophic levels.

Being such an important and widespread genus in oceans worldwide, Cafeteria is often used as a representative taxon for heterotrophic nanoflagellate grazers broadly in research regarding microbe grazing in the ocean. For example, De Court et al.’s 2019 study used C. roenbergensis as the predator species to different species of bacteria and archaea cells to show that archaea are also consumed by heterotrophic grazers, suggesting that the grazers exert top-down control on archaea populations as well. This has implications for carbon cycling as it indicates that carbon sequestered by chemoautolithotrophic archaea is being incorporated into higher trophic levels via heterotrophic nanoflagellate grazers like Cafeteria.

=== Habitat and Distribution ===
Cafeteria is found in environmental samples from marine and brackish waters around the world. Some species, like the most abundant species C. burkhardae, have a cosmopolitan distribution, while others are found only in particular waters. This is often reflected in their species name; for example, C. maldiviensis, is only found in the Indian Ocean. Cafeteria has been isolated from both surface water and deep ocean samples, including from extreme environments such as hydrothermal vents. In particular, genetically similar C. burkhardae strains have been isolated from both surface water and deep-sea samples, and Cafeteria cells have been found on detritus sinking from surface waters to the deep sea. It is unclear if the surface water and deep-sea populations of Cafeteria are continuous, and if they represent a biological link between the two environments.

The genus tends to thrive and be dominant in deeper waters with low biodiversity due to their ability to survive in these harsh conditions while other organisms cannot. Their feeding style involves attaching themselves to a substrate, such as particles of suspended organic material, which keeps them in close proximity to nutrient-rich hot spots in otherwise nutrient-poor waters. Cafeteria have also been found to be able to survive in a wide range of abiotic conditions. Cultured Cafeteria cells of several species have been able to survive salinity from a range of 2-150 PSU, though strains sampled from more brackish waters have lower tolerance to hypersalinity. Cafeteria cells have also been able to survive at high pressure (up to 500bar) and low temperature (2 °C) conditions that are unlivable for many other marine heterotrophic flagellates. In fact, Cafeteria populations not only survive in these conditions, but have been observed to have increased growth rates when moved from surface ocean conditions to low temperature, high pressure conditions. This wide range of habitat conditions is what allows Cafeteria to have such widespread distribution.

As very successful r-strategists, Cafeteria is a genus that thrives in cultivated samples due to its ability to take advantage of the abundance of nutrients supplied to promote the growth of the cultures, while other potentially more abundant species are resistant to cultivation. As cultivated strains are typically used to assess the diversity of eukaryotes in water samples, this leads to potential bias in how abundant Cafeteria and other similar genera are in the area the sample is taken from. Though this cultivation bias may lead Cafeteria to be overrepresented in some environments, it also causes it to be underrepresented in others. Species that live in extreme abiotic conditions are often resistant to cultivation due to the specificity of their living conditions; for this reason a species like Cafeteria paulosalfera, that is found in the Atacama Desert and has very low salinity tolerance, had to be cultured for identification using artificially hypersaline water, as it would have been resistant to cultivation in the salinity levels of a typical cultivation study. For this reason cultivation bias may be limiting understanding of the true distribution and abundance of Cafeteria.

=== Evolution ===
Cafeteria cells do not have any hard structures, thecae, or other encasements that could be fossilized and therefore do not exist in the fossil record. Cafeteria are among the colourless, non-photosynthetic lineages of stramenopiles that are assumed to be at the base of the stramenopile phylogenetic tree. There is little certainty about the relationships among these groups, like within the Bicosoecida, due to a lack of widespread sequencing for analysis. Strains of Cafeteria, being a well-studied genus of this presumably early-branching group, have been among the first bicosoecids to have their genomes sequenced, and therefore have a lot of potential to reveal more about the evolutionary history of stramenopiles.

== Research applications ==
=== Cafeteria roenbergensis virus (CroV) and Eukaryotic Transposons ===
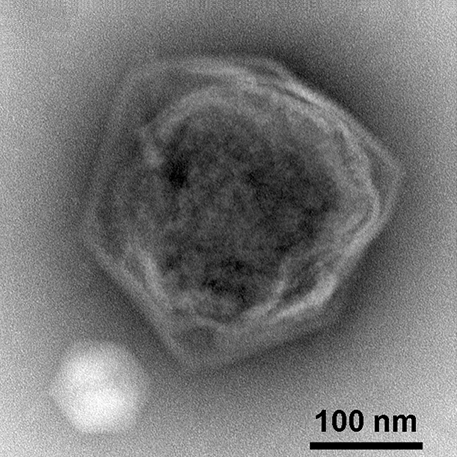
Cafeteria roenbergensis virus (dark) and associated Mavirus (light) under electron microscopy.

A giant virus infecting Cafeteria cells was first described in 2010 and called the Cafeteria roenbergensis Virus (CroV). Upon first publication the virus was notable for having the largest genome of any described marine virus and was identified as a close relative of the Acanthamoeba polyphaga mimivirus (APMV), which infects amoeba species Acanthamoeba polyphaga. In the following year a virus that infects CroV was discovered; it was found to reduce replication of CroV in the host Cafeteria cell, as well as preventing cell lysis, thus making it a virus that benefits the host cell rather than harms it. This virus’ name, Mavirus, is an abbreviation of “Maverick virus”, a reference to the fact that the genome of the virus shares seven homologous protein-coding sequences with Maverick/Polinton transposons found in eukaryotic cells. These as well as other similarities are strong enough to suggest a shared evolutionary history between the Mavirus and these transposons. This would imply that a Mavirus-like ancestor was incorporated into an early eukaryotic cell’s genome, possibly as a way to fight off infections from a virus like CroV. Studies using Cafeteria have been used to hypothesize that single-celled eukaryotes utilize virophages as a sort of adapted protection against viral infection. In the case of some C. burkhardae strains, Mavirus has been found incorporated into the cell’s genome, where it remains dormant until activated by infection by CroV. Research using Cafeteria and its associated viruses has been key in developing the hypothesis that eukaryotic transposons are evolutionarily related to viruses.

The identification of Mavirus was the second time a virus that has a deleterious effect on another virus had been observed. The first was a virus that infected CroV’s close relative APMV called Sputnik, the description of which coined the term “virophage”. CroV’s Mavirus being the second described virophage suggested that this phenomenon was more common than previously anticipated. As of 2023, there are now 39 described virophage species associated with different eukaryotes and the viruses that infect them. Virophages now occupy their own phylogenetic family, Lavidaviridae, with the Sputnik virus and Cafeteria’s Mavirus as representatives for the two genera Sputnikovirus and Mavirus. Virophages have significant implications for human medical research as possible new methods for anti-viral treatments and vaccine development.
