= Bicosidia =

- Cafeteria roenbergensis, a non-loricate bicosoecid

Scientific classification
- Domain: Eukaryota
- Clade: Sar
- Clade: Stramenopiles
- Phylum: Bigyra
- Class: Bikosea
- Subclass: Bicosidia; Cavalier-Smith, 2013

Superorders
- Borokiae; Cyathobodoniae

Subclass of single-celled organisms

Bicosidia is a subclass of Bikosea, a small group of unicellular flagellates, included among the heterokonts.
