= Sea surface microlayer =

Boundary layer where all exchange occurs between the atmosphere and the ocean

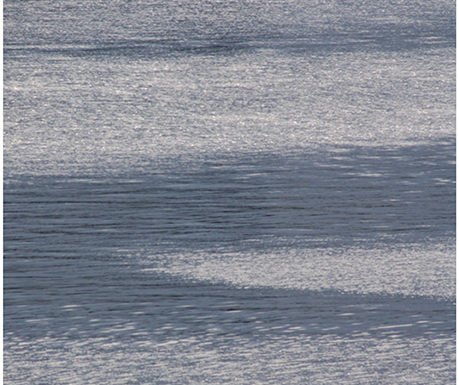
Sea slicks can provide valuable nurseries for marine larvae

The sea surface microlayer (SML) is the boundary interface between the atmosphere and ocean, covering about 70% of Earth's surface. With an operationally defined thickness between 1 and 1,000 μm (1.0 mm), the SML has physicochemical and biological properties that are measurably distinct from underlying waters. Recent studies now indicate that the SML covers the ocean to a significant extent, and evidence shows that it is an aggregate-enriched biofilm environment with distinct microbial communities. Because of its unique position at the air-sea interface, the SML is central to a range of global marine biogeochemical and climate-related processes.

The sea surface microlayer is the boundary layer where all exchange occurs between the atmosphere and the ocean. The chemical, physical, and biological properties of the SML differ greatly from the sub-surface water just a few centimeters beneath.

Despite the huge extent of the ocean's surface, until now relatively little attention has been paid to the sea surface microlayer (SML) as the ultimate interface where heat, momentum and mass exchange between the ocean and the atmosphere takes place. Via the SML, large-scale environmental changes in the ocean such as warming, acidification, deoxygenation, and eutrophication potentially influence cloud formation, precipitation, and the global radiation balance. Due to the deep connectivity between biological, chemical, and physical processes, studies of the SML may reveal multiple sensitivities to global and regional changes.

Understanding the processes at the ocean's surface, in particular involving the SML as an important and determinant interface, could provide an essential contribution to the reduction of uncertainties regarding ocean-climate feedbacks. As of 2017, processes occurring within the SML, as well as the associated rates of material exchange through the SML, remained poorly understood and were rarely represented in marine and atmospheric numerical models.

== Overview ==
The sea surface microlayer (SML) is the boundary interface between the atmosphere and ocean, covering about 70% of the Earth's surface. The SML has physicochemical and biological properties that are measurably distinct from underlying waters. Because of its unique position at the air-sea interface, the SML is central to a range of global biogeochemical and climate-related processes. Although known for the last six decades, the SML often has remained in a distinct research niche, primarily as it was not thought to exist under typical oceanic conditions. Recent studies now indicate that the SML covers the ocean to a significant extent, highlighting its global relevance as the boundary layer linking two major components of the Earth system – the ocean and the atmosphere.

In 1983, Sieburth hypothesised that the SML was a hydrated gel-like layer formed by a complex mixture of carbohydrates, proteins, and lipids. In recent years, his hypothesis has been confirmed, and scientific evidence indicates that the SML is an aggregate-enriched biofilm environment with distinct microbial communities. In 1999 Ellison et al. estimated that 200 Tg C yr^{−1} (200 million tonnes of carbon per year) accumulates in the SML, similar to sedimentation rates of carbon to the ocean's seabed, though the accumulated carbon in the SML probably has a very short residence time. Although the total volume of the microlayer is very small compared to the ocean's volume, Carlson suggested in his seminal 1993 paper that unique interfacial reactions may occur in the SML that may not occur in the underlying water or at a much slower rate there. He therefore hypothesised that the SML plays an important role in the diagenesis of carbon in the upper ocean. Biofilm-like properties and highest possible exposure to solar radiation leads to an intuitive assumption that the SML is a biochemical microreactor.

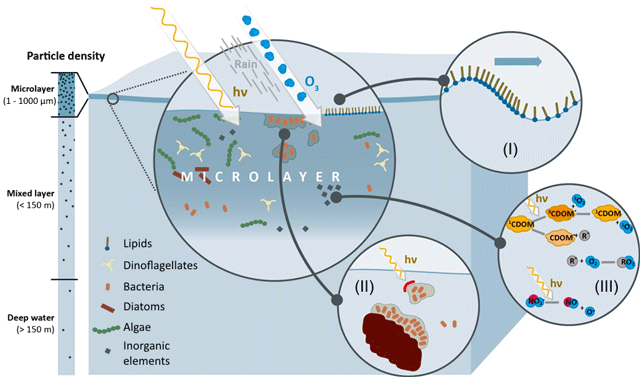
Sea surface microlayer as a biochemical microreactor: 1. Unique chemical orientation, reaction and aggregation; 2. Distinct microbial communities processing dissolved and particulate organic matter; 3. Highest exposure of solar radiation drives photochemical >reactions and formation of radicals

Historically, the SML has been summarized as being a microhabitat composed of several layers distinguished by their ecological, chemical and physical properties with an operational total thickness of between 1 and 1000 μm. In 2005 Hunter defined the SML as a "microscopic portion of the surface ocean which is in contact with the atmosphere and which may have physical, chemical or biological properties that are measurably different from those of adjacent sub-surface waters". He avoids a definite range of thickness as it depends strongly on the feature of interest. A thickness of 60 μm has been measured based on sudden changes of the pH, and could be meaningfully used for studying the physicochemical properties of the SML. At such thickness, the SML represents a laminar layer, free of turbulence, and greatly affecting the exchange of gases between the ocean and atmosphere. As a habitat for neuston (surface-dwelling organisms ranging from bacteria to larger siphonophores), the thickness of the SML in some ways depends on the organism or ecological feature of interest. In 2005, Zaitsev described the SML and associated near-surface layer (down to 5 cm) as an incubator or nursery for eggs and larvae for a wide range of aquatic organisms.

Hunter's definition includes all interlinked layers from the laminar layer to the nursery without explicit reference to defined depths. In 2017, Wurl et al. proposed Hunter's definition be validated with a redeveloped SML paradigm that includes its global presence, biofilm-like properties and role as a nursery. The new paradigm pushes the SML into a new and wider context relevant to many ocean and climate sciences.

According to Wurl et al., the SML can never be devoid of organics due to the abundance of surface-active substances (e.g., surfactants) in the upper ocean and the phenomenon of surface tension at air-liquid interfaces. The SML is analogous to the thermal boundary layer, and remote sensing of the sea surface temperature shows ubiquitous anomalies between the sea surface skin and bulk temperature. Even so, the differences in both are driven by different processes. Enrichment, defined as concentration ratios of an analyte in the SML to the underlying bulk water, has been used for decades as evidence for the existence of the SML. Consequently, depletions of organics in the SML are debatable; however, the question of enrichment or depletion is likely to be a function of the thickness of the SML (which varies with sea state; including losses via sea spray, the concentrations of organics in the bulk water, and the limitations of sampling techniques to collect thin layers . Enrichment of surfactants, and changes in the sea surface temperature and salinity, serve as universal indicators for the presence of the SML. Organisms are perhaps less suitable as indicators of the SML because they can actively avoid the SML and/or the harsh conditions in the SML may reduce their populations. However, the thickness of the SML remains "operational" in field experiments because the thickness of the collected layer is governed by the sampling method. Advances in SML sampling technology are needed to improve our understanding of how the SML influences air-sea interactions.

Marine surface habitats sit at the interface between the atmosphere and the ocean. The biofilm-like habitat at the surface of the ocean harbours surface-dwelling microorganisms, commonly referred to as neuston. The sea surface microlayer (SML) constitutes the uppermost layer of the ocean, only 1–1000 μm thick, with unique chemical and biological properties that distinguish it from the underlying water (ULW). Due to the location at the air-sea interface, the SML can influence exchange processes across this boundary layer, such as air-sea gas exchange and the formation of sea spray aerosols.

Due to its exclusive position between the atmosphere and the hydrosphere and by spanning about 70% of the Earth's surface, the sea-surface microlayer (sea-SML) is regarded as a fundamental component in air–sea exchange processes and in biogeochemical cycling. Although having a minor thickness of <1000 μm, the elusive SML is long known for its distinct physicochemical characteristics compared to the underlying water, e.g., by featuring the accumulation of dissolved and particulate organic matter, transparent exopolymer particles (TEP), and surface-active molecules. Therefore, the SML is a gelatinous biofilm, maintaining physical stability through surface tension forces. It also forms a vast habitat for different organisms, collectively termed as neuston with a recent global estimate of 2 × 1023 microbial cells for the sea-SML.

Life at air–water interfaces has never been considered easy, mainly because of the harsh environmental conditions that influence the SML. However, high abundances of microorganisms, especially of bacteria and picophytoplankton, accumulating in the SML compared to the underlying water were frequently reported, accompanied by a predominant heterotrophic activity. This is because primary production at the immediate air–water interface is often hindered by photoinhibition. However, some exceptions of photosynthetic organisms, e.g., Trichodesmium, Synechococcus, or Sargassum, show more tolerance towards high light intensities and, hence, can become enriched in the SML. Previous research has provided evidence that neustonic organisms can cope with wind and wave energy, solar and ultraviolet (UV) radiation, fluctuations in temperature and salinity, and a higher potential predation risk by the zooneuston. Furthermore, wind action promoting sea spray formation and bubbles rising from deeper water and bursting at the surface release SML-associated microbes into the atmosphere. In addition to being more concentrated compared to planktonic counterparts, the bacterioneuston, algae, and protists display distinctive community compositions compared to the underlying water, in both marine and freshwater habitats. Furthermore, the bacterial community composition was often dependent on the SML sampling device being used. While being well defined with respect to bacterial community composition, little is known about viruses in the SML, i.e., the virioneuston. This review has its focus on virus–bacterium dynamics at air–water interfaces, even if viruses likely interact with other SML microbes, including archaea and the phytoneuston, as can be deduced from viral interference with their planktonic counterparts. Although viruses were briefly mentioned as pivotal SML components in a recent review on this unique habitat, a synopsis of the emerging knowledge and the major research gaps regarding bacteriophages at air–water interfaces is still missing in the literature.

== Properties ==
Organic compounds such as amino acids, carbohydrates, fatty acids, and phenols are highly enriched in the SML interface. Most of these come from biota in the sub-surface waters, which decay and become transported to the surface, though other sources exist also such as atmospheric deposition, coastal runoff, and anthropogenic nutrification. The relative concentration of these compounds is dependent on the nutrient sources as well as climate conditions such as wind speed and precipitation. These organic compounds on the surface create a "film," referred to as a "slick" when visible, which affects the physical and optical properties of the interface. These films occur because of the hydrophobic tendencies of many organic compounds, which cause them to protrude into the air-interface. The existence of organic surfactants on the ocean surface impedes wave formation for low wind speeds. For increasing concentrations of surfactant there is an increasing critical wind speed necessary to create ocean waves. Increased levels of organic compounds at the surface also hinder air-sea gas exchange at low wind speeds. One way in which particulates and organic compounds on the surface are transported into the atmosphere is the process called "bubble bursting". Bubbles generate the major portion of marine aerosols. They can be dispersed to heights of several meters, picking up whatever particles latch on to their surface. However, the major supplier of materials comes from the SML.

== Processes ==
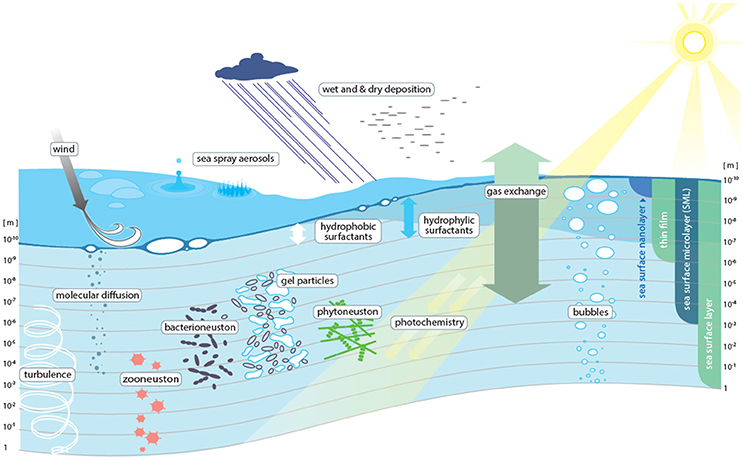
Transport processes across the sea surface microlayer

Surfaces and interfaces are critical zones where major physical, chemical, and biological exchanges occur. As the ocean covers 362 million km^{2}, about 71% of the Earth's surface, the ocean-atmosphere interface is plausibly one of the largest and most important interfaces on the planet. Every substance entering or leaving the ocean from or to the atmosphere passes through this interface, which on the water-side -and to a lesser extent on the air-side- shows distinct physical, chemical, and biological properties. On the water side the uppermost 1 to 1000 μm of this interface are referred to as the sea surface microlayer (SML). Like a skin, the SML is expected to control the rates of exchange of energy and matter between air and sea, thereby potentially exerting both short-term and long-term impacts on various Earth system processes, including biogeochemical cycling, production and uptake of radiately active gases like CO_{2} or DMS, thus ultimately climate regulation. As of 2017, processes occurring within the SML, as well as the associated rates of material exchange through the SML, remained poorly understood and were rarely represented in marine and atmospheric numerical models.

An improved understanding of the biological, chemical, and physical processes at the ocean's upper surface could provide an essential contribution to the reduction of uncertainties regarding ocean-climate feedbacks. Due to its positioning between atmosphere and ocean, the SML is the first to be exposed to climate changes including temperature, climate relevant trace gases, wind speed, and precipitation as well as to pollution by human waste, including nutrients, toxins, nanomaterials, and plastic debris.

== Bacterioneuston ==
The term neuston describes the organisms in the SML and was first suggested by Naumann in 1917. As in other marine ecosystems, bacterioneuston communities have important roles in SML functioning. Bacterioneuston community composition of the SML has been analysed and compared to the underlying water in different habitats with varying results, and has primarily focused on coastal waters and shelf seas, with limited study of the open ocean . In the North Sea, a distinct bacterial community was found in the SML with Vibrio spp. and Pseudoalteromonas spp. dominating the bacterioneuston. During an artificially induced phytoplankton bloom in a fjord mesocosm experiment, the most dominant denaturing gradient gel electrophoresis (DGGE) bands of the bacterioneuston consisted of two bacterial families: Flavobacteriaceae and Alteromonadaceae. Other studies have however, found little or no differences in the bacterial community composition of the SML and the ULW. Difficulties in direct comparisons between studies can arise because of the different methods used to sample the SML, which result in varied sampling depths.

Even less is known about the community control mechanisms in the SML and how the bacterial community assembles at the air-sea interface. The bacterioneuston community could be altered by differing wind conditions and radiation levels, with high wind speeds inhibiting the formation of a distinct bacterioneuston community. Wind speed and radiation levels refer to external controls, however, bacterioneuston community composition might also be influenced by internal factors such as nutrient availability and organic matter (OM) produced either in the SML or in the ULW.

One of the principal OM components consistently enriched in the SML are transparent exopolymer particles (TEP), which are rich in carbohydrates and form by the aggregation of dissolved precursors excreted by phytoplankton in the euphotic zone. Higher TEP formation rates in the SML, facilitated through wind shear and dilation of the surface water, have been proposed as one explanation for the observed enrichment in TEP. Also, due to their natural positive buoyancy, when not ballasted by other particles sticking to them, TEP ascend through the water column and ultimately end up at the SML . A second possible pathway of TEP from the water column to the SML is by bubble scavenging.

Next to rising bubbles, another potential transport mechanism for bacteria from the ULW to the SML could be ascending particles or more specifically TEP. Bacteria readily attach to TEP in the water column. TEP can serve as microbial hotspots and can be used directly as a substrate for bacterial degradation, and as grazing protection for attached bacteria, e.g., by acting as an alternate food source for zooplankton. TEP have also been suggested to serve as light protection for microorganisms in environments with high irradiation.

== Virioneuston ==
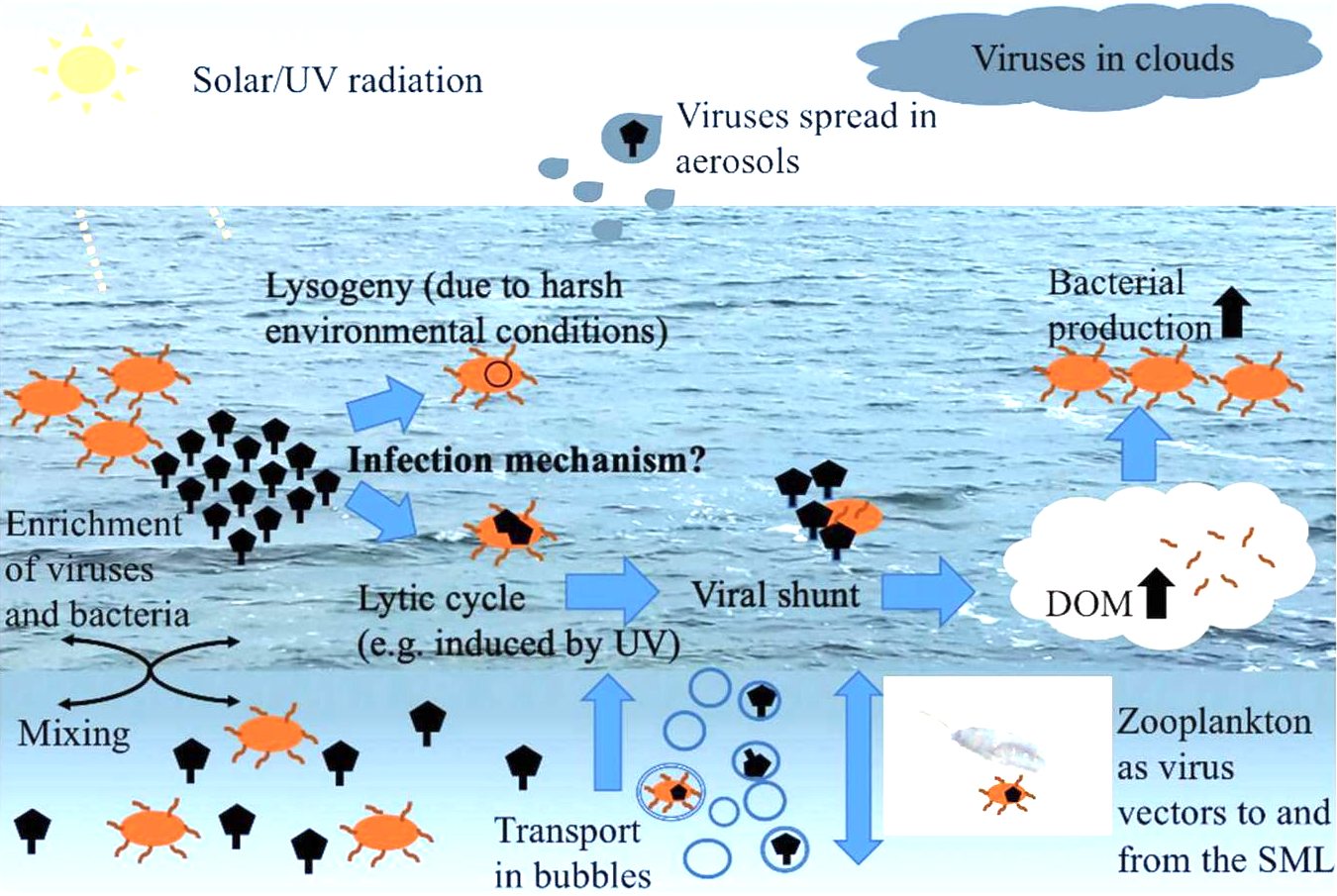
Viral–bacterial dynamics in the surface microlayer (SML) of the ocean and beyond. DOM = dissolved organic matter, UV = ultraviolet.

Viruses in the sea surface microlayer, the so-called virioneuston, have recently become of interest to researchers as enigmatic biological entities in the boundary surface layers with potentially important ecological impacts. Given this vast air–water interface sits at the intersection of major air–water exchange processes spanning more than 70% of the global surface area, it is likely to have profound implications for marine biogeochemical cycles, on the microbial loop and gas exchange, as well as the marine food web structure, the global dispersal of airborne viruses originating from the sea surface microlayer, and human health.

Viruses are the most abundant biological entities in the water column of the world's oceans. In the free water column, the virioplankton typically outnumbers the bacterioplankton by one order of magnitude reaching typical bulk water concentrations of 10^{7} viruses mL^{−1}. Moreover, they are known as integral parts of global biogeochemical cycles to shape and drive microbial diversity and to structure trophic networks. Like other neuston members, the virioneuston likely originates from the bulk seawater. For instance, in 1977 Baylor et al. postulated adsorption of viruses onto air bubbles as they rise to the surface, or viruses can stick to organic particles also being transported to the SML via bubble scavenging.

Within the SML, viruses interacting with the bacterioneuston will probably induce the viral shunt, a phenomenon that is well known for marine pelagic systems. The term viral shunt describes the release of organic carbon and other nutritious compounds from the virus-mediated lysis of host cells, and its addition to the local dissolved organic matter (DOM) pool. The enriched and densely packed bacterioneuston forms an excellent target for viruses compared to the bacterioplankton populating the subsurface. This is because high host-cell numbers will increase the probability of host–virus encounters. The viral shunt might effectively contribute to the SML's already high DOM content enhancing bacterial production as previously suggested for pelagic ecosystems and in turn replenishing host cells for viral infections. By affecting the DOM pool, viruses in the SML might directly interfere with the microbial loop being initiated when DOM is microbially recycled, converted into biomass, and passed along the food web. In addition, the release of DOM from lysed host cells by viruses contributes to organic particle generation. However, the role of the virioneuston for the microbial loop has never been investigated.

== Measurement ==
Devices used to sample the concentrations of particulates and compounds of the SML include a glass fabric, metal mesh screens, and other hydrophobic surfaces. These are placed on a rotating cylinder which collects surface samples as it rotates on top of the ocean surface.

The glass plate sampler is commonly used. It was first described in 1972 by Harvey and Burzell as a simple but effective method of collecting small sea surface microlayer samples. A clean glass plate is immersed vertically into the water and then withdrawn in a controlled manner. Harvey and Burzell used a plate which was 20 cm square and 4 mm thick. They withdrew it from the sea at the rate of 20 cm per second. Typically the uppermost 20–150 μm of the surface microlayer adheres to the plate as it is withdrawn. The sample is then wiped from both sides of the plate into a sampling vial.

Glass plate sampling of the sea surface microlayer

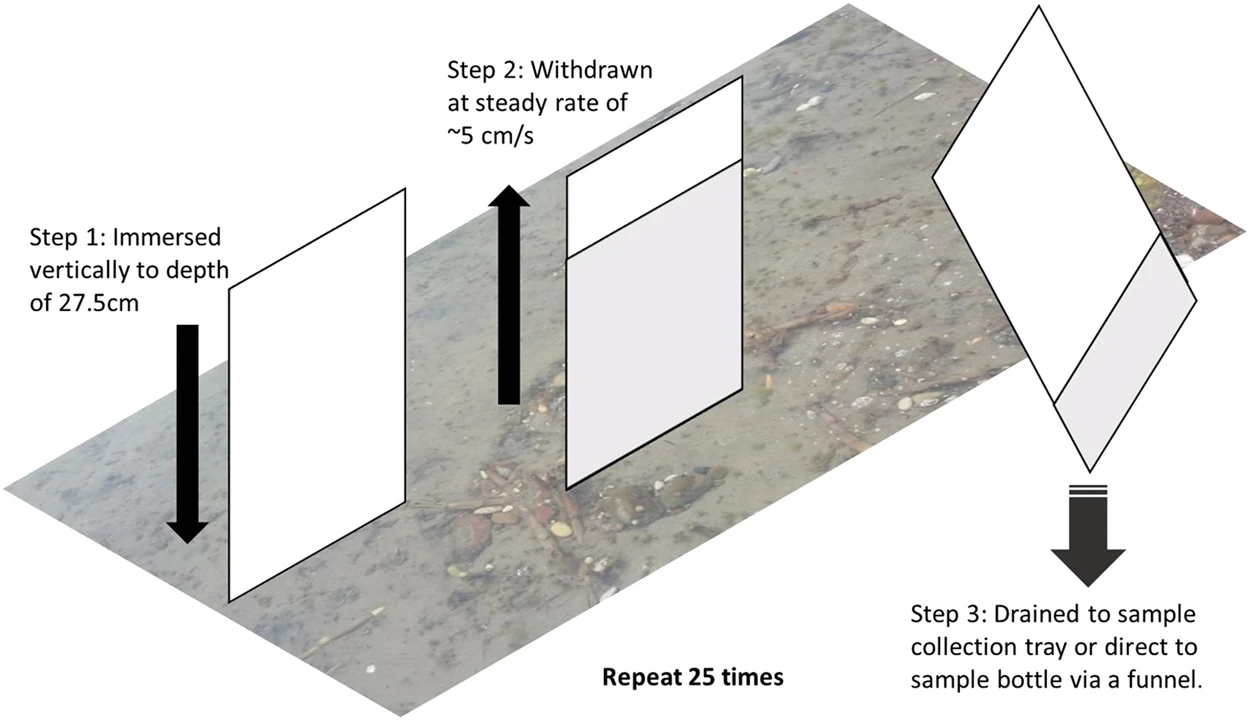
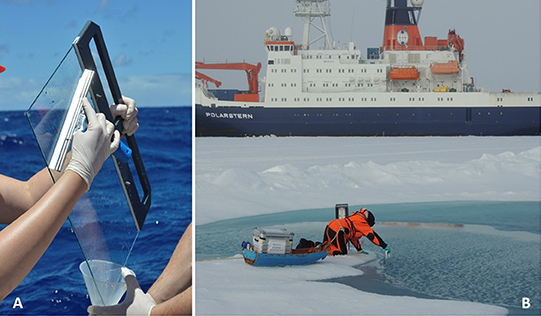

For a plate of the size used by Harvey and Burzel, the resulting sample volumes are between about 3 and 12 cubic centimetres. The sampled SML thickness h in micrometres is given by:

$$\mathrm{h} = \frac{104 V}{A N}$$

where V is the sample volume in cm^{3}, A is the total immersed plate area of both sides in cm^{2}, and N is the number of times the sample was dipped.

== Remote sensing ==
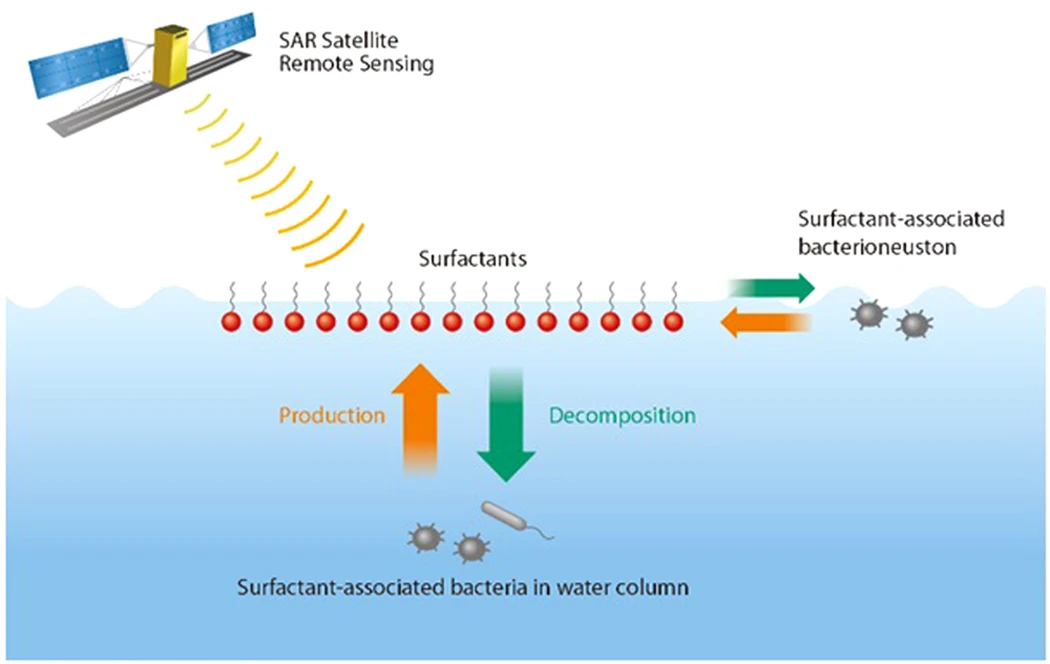
Bacteria, sea slicks and satellite remote sensing. Surfactants are capable of dampening the short capillary ocean surface waves and smoothing the sea surface. Synthetic aperture radar (SAR) satellite remote sensing can detect areas with concentrated surfactants or sea slicks, which appear as dark areas on the SAR images.

Ocean surface habitats sit at the interface between the ocean and the atmosphere. The biofilm-like habitat at the surface of the ocean harbours surface-dwelling microorganisms, commonly referred to as neuston. This vast air–water interface sits at the intersection of major air–water exchange processes spanning more than 70% of the global surface area . Bacteria in the surface microlayer of the ocean, called bacterioneuston, are of interest due to practical applications such as air-sea gas exchange of greenhouse gases, production of climate-active marine aerosols, and remote sensing of the ocean. Of specific interest is the production and degradation of surfactants (surface active materials) via microbial biochemical processes. Major sources of surfactants in the open ocean include phytoplankton, terrestrial runoff, and deposition from the atmosphere.

Unlike coloured algal blooms, surfactant-associated bacteria may not be visible in ocean colour imagery. Having the ability to detect these "invisible" surfactant-associated bacteria using synthetic aperture radar has immense benefits in all-weather conditions, regardless of cloud, fog, or daylight. This is particularly important in very high winds, because these are the conditions when the most intense air-sea gas exchanges and marine aerosol production take place. Therefore, in addition to colour satellite imagery, SAR satellite imagery may provide additional insights into a global picture of biophysical processes at the boundary between the ocean and atmosphere, air-sea greenhouse gas exchanges and production of climate-active marine aerosols.

== Aeroplankton ==
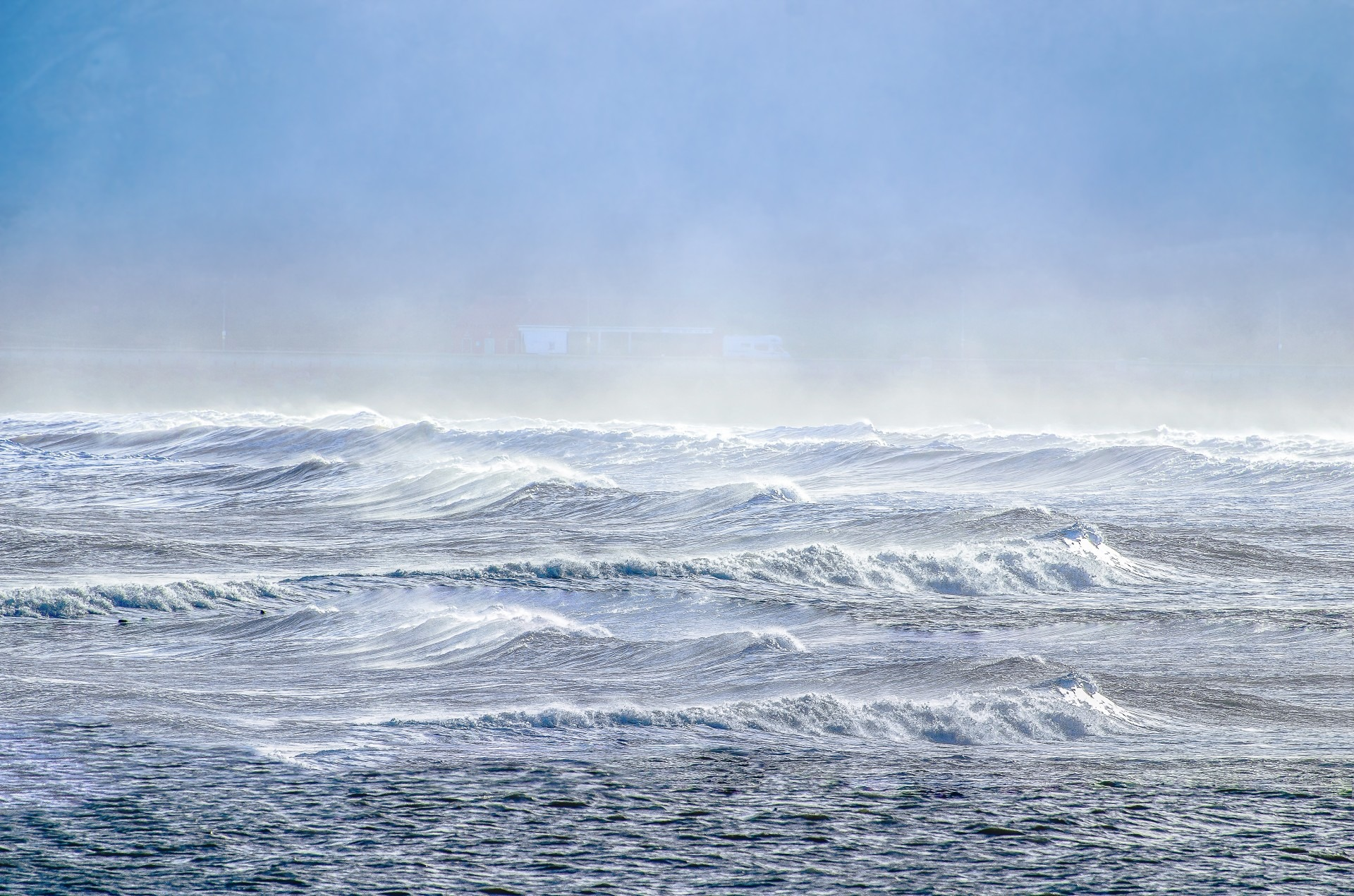
Sea spray containing marine microorganisms can be swept high into the atmosphere and may travel the globe as aeroplankton before falling back to earth.

A stream of airborne microorganisms, including marine viruses, bacteria and protists, circles the planet above weather systems but below commercial air lanes. Some peripatetic microorganisms are swept up from terrestrial dust storms, but most originate from marine microorganisms in sea spray. In 2018, scientists reported that hundreds of millions of these viruses and tens of millions of bacteria are deposited daily on every square meter around the planet.

Compared to the sub-surface waters, the sea surface microlayer contains elevated concentration of bacteria and viruses, as well as toxic metals and organic pollutants. These materials can be transferred from the sea-surface to the atmosphere in the form of wind-generated aqueous aerosols due to their high vapor tension and a process known as volatilisation. When airborne, these microbes can be transported long distances to coastal regions. If they hit land they can have detrimental effects on animals, vegetation and human health. Marine aerosols that contain viruses can travel hundreds of kilometers from their source and remain in liquid form as long as the humidity is high enough (over 70%). These aerosols are able to remain suspended in the atmosphere for about 31 days. Evidence suggests that bacteria can remain viable after being transported inland through aerosols. Some reached as far as 200 meters at 30 meters above sea level. It was also noted that the process which transfers this material to the atmosphere causes further enrichment in both bacteria and viruses in comparison to either the SML or sub-surface waters (up to three orders of magnitude in some locations).

== Mathematical modeling ==
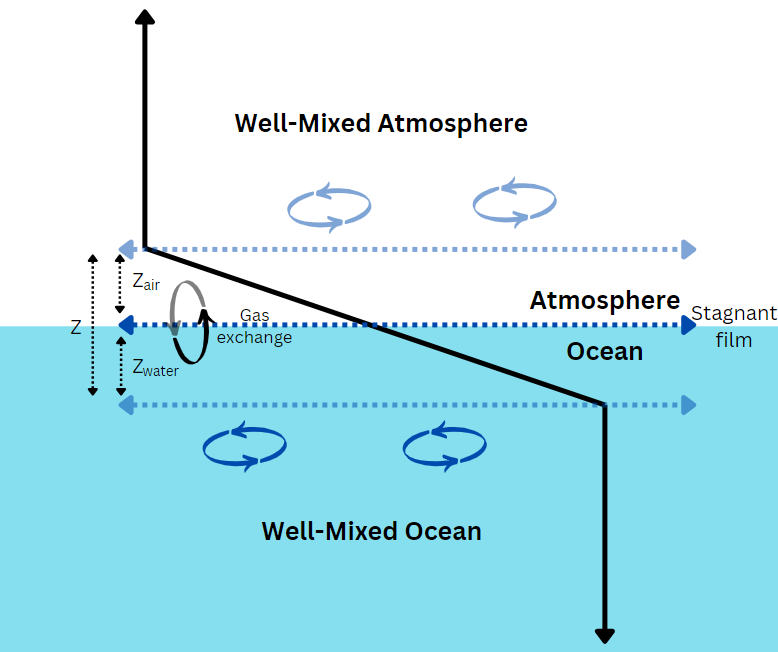
The stagnant film model showing gas exchange between a mixed atmosphere and mixed ocean with a film in-between with thickness Z

The stagnant film model is a mathematical model used to simulate the sea surface microlayer. It is a kinematic model which can be used to describe how gas exchange from the ocean's surface and the atmosphere reaches equilibrium. The model assumes both the ocean and atmosphere are composed mostly of well-mixed, constantly moving fluid layers with the sea surface microlayer present as a permanent thin-film layer in the middle. Gas exchange occurs by molecular diffusion between the two fluid layers through the sea surface microlayer.

== See also ==
- Ocean surface ecosystem
- Ocean surface topography
- Planetary boundary layer
- Surface layer
