= Borokiae =

Scientific classification
- Domain: Eukaryota
- (unranked): SAR
- (unranked): Heterokonta
- Class: Bikosea
- Subclass: Bicosidia
- Superorder: Borokiae Cavalier-Smith, 2006

Orders
- See text

Superorder of single-celled organisms

Borokiae is a superorder of bicosoecids, a small group of unicellular flagellates, included among the heterokonts.

== Classification ==
- Order Borokales Cavalier-Smith 2006
  - Family Borokidae Cavalier-Smith 2006
    - Genus Boroka Cavalier-Smith 2006
