= Cafeteria roenbergensis =

Scientific classification
- Domain: Eukaryota
- Clade: Sar
- Clade: Stramenopiles
- Phylum: Bigyra
- Order: Bicosoecida
- Family: Cafeteriaceae
- Genus: Cafeteria
- Species: C. roenbergensis

Binomial name
- Cafeteria roenbergensis Fenchel & Patterson, 1988

Species of single-celled organism

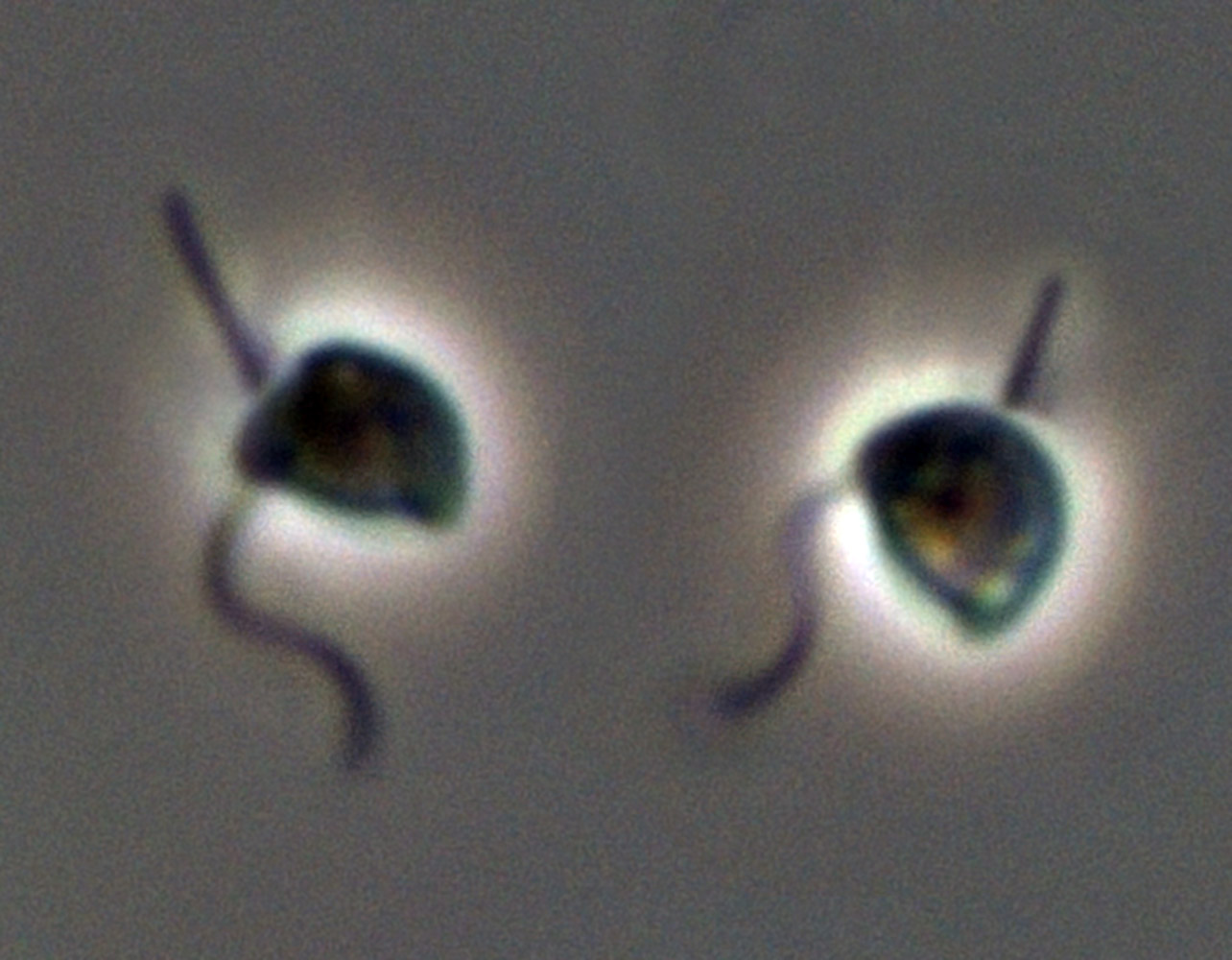
Two living cells of C. roenbergensis. Light micrograph. The cells are about 6 μm long. The anterior flagellum beats with an undulating pattern, the posterior (recurrent or smooth) flagellum usually holds the cell to the substrate.

Cafeteria roenbergensis is a small bacterivorous marine flagellate. It was discovered by Danish marine ecologist Tom Fenchel and named by him and taxonomist David J. Patterson in 1988. It is in one of three genera of bicosoecids, and the first discovered of two known Cafeteria species. Bicosoecids belong to a broad group, the stramenopiles, also known as heterokonts (Heterokonta) that includes photosynthetic groups such as diatoms, brown, and golden algae, and non-photosynthetic groups such as opalinids, actinophryid "heliozoans", and oomycetes. The species is found primarily in coastal waters where there are high concentrations of bacteria on which it grazes. Its voracious appetite plays a significant role in regulating bacteria populations.

== Physiology ==
Cafeteria roenbergensis is a slightly flattened, kidney-shaped bicosoecid. Its cell typically measures between 3 and 10 μm and it has a volume of around 20 μm^{3}. It is colorless and has two unequally sized flagella. The smooth flagellum, angled posteriorly, is shorter, and attaches to substrates in non-motile cells, but trails behind in motile cells. The hairy flagellum points forward in an arc in sessile cells. Cafeteria is a eukaryotic organism, so it contains the typical organelles such as mitochondria and nuclei.

Cafeteria roenbergensis reproduces asexually via binary fission, first replicating the flagella and internal organelles before the cell divides. No sexual activity is known for this species. Cells can replicate in under 10 hours.

== Behavior ==
Cafeteria roenbergensis is a suspension feeder, meaning that it feeds by filtering suspended bacteria, its primary food source, and other particulate matter from the water. Its two flagella facilitate feeding, locomotion and attachment to substrates. The anterior flagellum is responsible for locomotion and feeding. It propels the cell in a swift spiral movement. During feeding, it beats at about 40 times per second to create a current of water that moves about 100 micrometers/second. This current brings bacteria to its mouthparts. The food is ingested below the base of the flagella, which is referred to as the ventral side. In nonmotile C. roenbergensis cells, (cells that prefer to anchor themselves to a substrate) the posterior flagellum helps attach the organism to a substrate while it is feeding. The flagella are anchored by 'rootlets' ribbons and subcellular ropes. They act as a skeleton and also support the mouth region.

== Ecology ==
Bacterivorous nanoflagellates, the general group to which C. roenbergensis belongs, make up a significant portion of the oceans' protozoan communities, as well as those in freshwater, soils and other habitats. They are reported to be the primary consumer of bacteria in many habitats, controlling bacterial populations as they "graze".

=== Habitat ===
Cafeteria roenbergensis has been found in all oceans examined, but is especially common in coastal waters. These protists occur in a type of biosphere known as "microbial assemblages". This means that they are present at such low abundances, that they are not easily detected, and can only be retrieved and isolated using specialized isolation techniques such as flow cytometry. Ishigaki and Sleigh (2001) found that C. roenbergensis ceased to reproduce when the concentration of bacteria that they were grazing on became less than 2.0×10^{7} cells ml^{−1}. Other flagellates were able to multiply at much lower bacterial concentrations, indicating that bacterial concentration is a limiting factor for Cafeteria. Flagellates have varying abilities to gather bacteria to their mouths with their flagella, and this study suggests that the abilities of Cafeteria species may be inferior to other flagellates, since Cafeteria are usually specific to niches with high concentrations of bacteria.

=== Virus ===
A giant virus, Cafeteria roenbergensis virus (CroV) infects and causes the lysis of C. roenbergensis. The impact of CroV on natural populations of C. roenbergensis remains unknown; however, the virus has been found to be very host specific, and does not infect other closely related organisms. C. roenbergensis is also infected by a second virus, the Mavirus virophage, which is only able to replicate in the presence of CroV. This virus interferes with the replication of CroV, which leads to the survival of C. roenbergensis cells. Mavirus is able to integrate into the genome of cells of C. roenbergensis, and thereby confer immunity to the population

== Taxonomy ==
Cafeteria is categorized in a group called the "Heterotrophic group". It has one other known species in its genus, Cafeteria minuta, which was found living in tropical marine sediments by Larsen and Patterson in 1990.

=== Name ===
Marine biologist Tom Fenchel, one of the two species authorities who first described C. roenbergensis, is credited with having joked about its name: "We found a new species of ciliate during a marine field course in Rønbjerg and named it Cafeteria roenbergensis because of its voracious and indiscriminate appetite after many dinner discussions in the local cafeteria."

== Mitochondrial genome ==
Cafeteria roenbergensis has a highly compact mitochondrial genome that includes less than 3.4% introns. Some sources hold that its mitochondrial genome contains no introns at all. The mitochondrial translation code in C. roenbergensis is not standard in comparison to its closest known relatives, Phytophthora infestans and Ochromonas danica. Instead of acting as a stop codon, in Cafeteria, UGA codes for tryptophan.

== Culture ==
Because they are easy to grow in culture, Cafeteria roenbergensis has been subject to a diversity of more detailed studies, such as genomic and ecological studies that have revealed that this species has the most functionally compact DNA amongst eukaryotes. While in culture, Cafeteria are fed Vibrio bacteria. In a test conducted by Park and Simpson in 2010, it was found that Cafeteria cells grow best in salinities of 3‰ to 100‰, but cannot survive at concentrations any higher.
