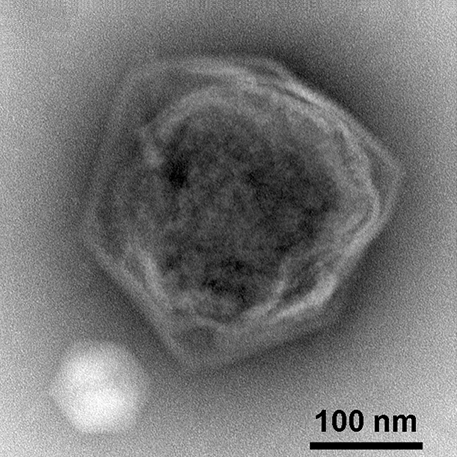
- The virophage Mavirus (lower left) with its associated giant virus CroV

Virus classification
- (unranked): Virus
- Realm: Varidnaviria
- Kingdom: Bamfordvirae
- Phylum: Preplasmiviricota
- Class: Virophaviricetes
- Order: Lavidavirales
- Family: Maviroviridae
- Genus: Mavirus
- Species: Mavirus cafeteriae

= Mavirus =

Genus of viruses

Mavirus is a genus of double stranded DNA virus that can infect the marine phagotrophic flagellate Cafeteria roenbergensis, but only in the presence of the giant CroV virus (Rheavirus sinusmexicani). The genus contains only one species: Mavirus cafeteriae. Mavirus can integrate into the genome of cells of C. roenbergensis, and thereby confer immunity to the population

The name is derived from Maverick virus.

The virophage was discovered by Matthias G. Fischer of the University of British Columbia while he was working on Cafeteria roenbergensis virus as part of his PhD.

== Virology ==
The genome is 19,063 bases long and encodes 20 predicted coding sequences. Seven have homology to the Maverick/Polinton family of transposons.

The genome encodes a retroviral integrase, an adenosine triphosphatase (ATPase), a cysteine protease and a protein primed DNA polymerase B.

== Classification ==
Mavirus is the sole genus in the family Maviroviridae, which is the sole family in the order Lavidavirales. Lavidavirales is in the class Virophaviricetes, which contains all virophages.
