= Parasites of phytoplankton =

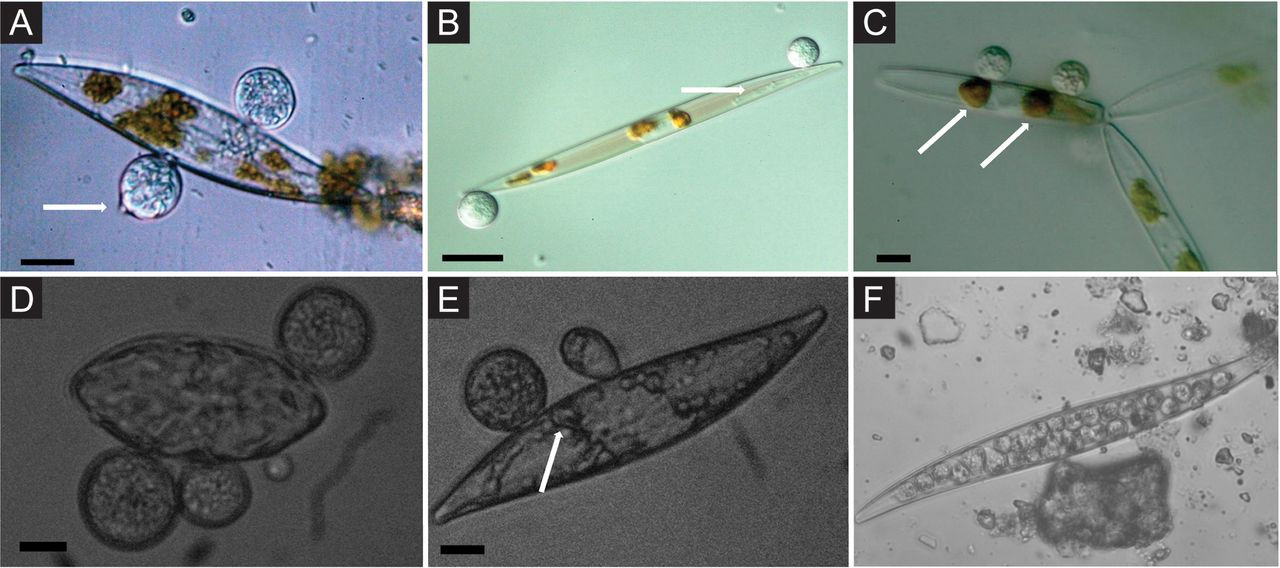
Chytrid parasites infecting diatoms

Phytoplankton are characterized as organisms which are unable to swim against a current and produce their own organic carbon via photosynthesis. They are responsible for producing approximately 50 percent of the Earth's primary productivity and are therefore crucial in maintaining both marine ecosystems and adding a significant amount of oxygen to the atmosphere. However, as with other organisms, phytoplankton are hosts to many diverse forms of parasites, including, but not limited to, fungal- and non-fungal zoosporic parasites, Dinoflagellates, Cercozoans, and viruses. Parasites use nutrients from their hosts, at that organisms expense, and display diverse methods of infection. Parasites can play integral roles in the dynamics and interactions between phytoplankton and their communities, such as controlling population abundance, distribution and biodiversity.

== Methods of parasitism ==
Similar to parasites of other organisms, parasites of phytoplankton have various methods of infecting and feeding on their hosts. Many have evolved special attachment structures to bind and penetrate host membranes. Following attachment, parasites may release enzymes into the host cytoplasm or begin feeding. In some cases, host cells engulf parasitic cells via endocytosis, passively allowing access to their intracellular compartments. Some parasites directly absorb nutrients, such as amino acids, carbohydrates and lipids through the host's cytoplasm once they have entered the host. Other parasites, like viruses, can inject their genetic material into their host's cells, and use host-cell material to reproduce more genetic material to carry on the virus life cycle. Parasites will also use their hosts for more effective dispersal throughout the ocean. By infecting semi-mobile hosts, such as phytoplankton that drift in the ocean, and reproducing within them, parasites can be released into new regions by lysing host cells or through the release of spores, to then continue their life cycle in new hosts.

== Fungal parasites of phytoplankton ==
Fungal parasites of phytoplankton occur in most pelagic aquatic systems, but historically been more recognized in freshwater lakes with high recorded mortality rates of phytoplankton; however, their prevalence in marine systems is increasingly documented. The overall importance of fungal parasites in aquatic systems is currently not well understood, with a large range in mortality estimates, and limited understanding of the fundamental biology behind their interactions with phytoplankton.

=== Chytrid parasites ===
The diversity of fungal parasites of phytoplankton is not well characterized, and largely emphasizes chytrids (phylum Chytridiomycota) as key phytoplankton parasites. Ooomycetes are fungus-like parasites of phytoplankton, but are not true fungi.

The chytrids are a group of mostly unicellular fungi, producing flagellated zoosporic parasites, and are quite small; with a diameter of 2-6 μm. The Chytrids are quite diverse, including saprotrophs, pathogens and parasites, and have been shown to be quite important in aquatic food webs, especially in freshwater systems, where fungal parasites have been shown to infect up to 90% of the diatom populations. In marine systems, chytrids are also the primary group of fungal parasites, where the interactions between fungi and diatoms are the most well studied examples; with some reports showing up to 93% of the infected diatom population being infected with Chytrid parasites.

The diversity of chytrid parasites is poorly characterized in marine systems as few studies on chytrids have been conducted in marine settings, similar to most marine fungi. However, recent advances in molecular genomics, with large scale DNA-based surveys in the marine environment, have begun to show the large diversity and abundance of Chytrid parasites in the ocean.

==== Hosts for chytrid parasites ====
Chytrids are usually quite host-specific, but their host range is poorly characterized, where some are quite specialist, only infecting specific strains, and some have been shown to be more generalist. Problems arise while defining host ranges as many chytrid-phytoplankton interactions have mostly been characterized under microscope, where the morphological similarity of the zoospores makes it difficult to distinguish the different species from each other.

Chytrids have been shown to infect phytoplankton of all size ranges, from small cyanobacteria to large diatoms. Although there tends to be a preference for the chytrids to infect blooming species, likely due to greater encounter rates, and release of phytoplankton derived organic matter which serves as targets for chytrid chemotaxis. A preference for larger phytoplankton, or large phytoplankton aggregates seems to also be a trend due to the higher encounter rates and more potential nutrients present for the parasites to replicate.

==== Implications of chytrids on food webs - the mycoloop ====
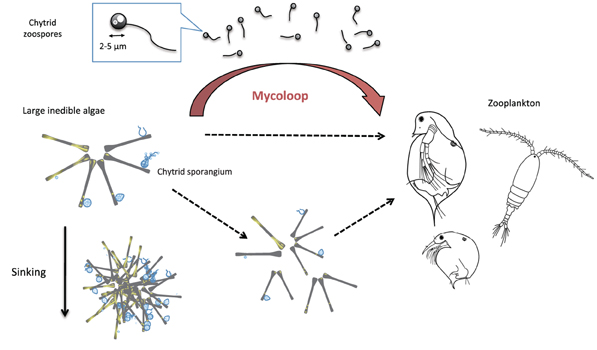
Schematic of the aquatic Mycoloop: including phytoplankton, zooplankton and chytrid parasites. The schematic shows how parasitism increases the amount of feed for zooplankton, and how parasitism increases aggregation and sinking.

Fungal parasites are grazed by zooplankton in aquatic systems, where they tend to be easier to consume than large phytoplankton; such as diatoms or filamentous cyanobacterial colonies. Large phytoplankton can often be inedible for many zooplankton, especially to smaller grazers, where the parasitism and successive release of easier-to-consume zoospores and fragmented phytoplankton particles can greatly enhance the available prey for the grazers. An in-vitro study conducted with the zooplankton Daphnia showed a near doubling in grazing rates on the filamentous cyanobacteria Planktothrix in the presence of chytrid parasites. However, another study conducted on diatoms showed how infection by chytrid parasites caused more aggregation of the diatoms, leading to less accessibility for Daphnia grazing. This indicates how the understanding of fungal parasites and their effects on food webs is complicated and requires more attention from marine scientists.

There are also effects from fungal parasitism on other microbial processes in aquatic systems. The release of phytoplankton-derived organic matter after fungal infection also feeds back dissolved organic matter into the microbial loop, further complicating the understanding of the food web. The prevalence of a trophic link between phytoplankton, zooplankton, heterotrophic bacteria and fungal parasites is becoming more evident, where the inclusion of fungi into food web models would improve the understanding and modeling of aquatic ecosystem dynamics.

== Phytoplankton viruses ==
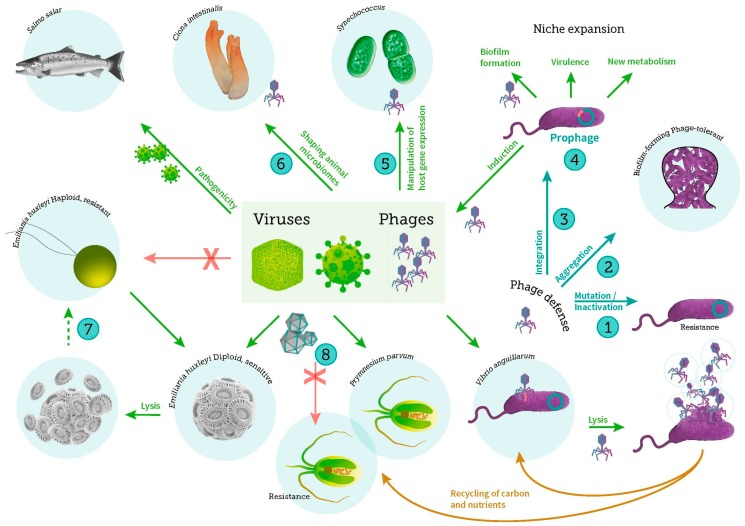
Simple schematic of marine viral infections

Phytoplankton viruses are a type of marine virus. There is substantial genetic variation in phytoplankton viruses, just as there is substantial variation in the types of phytoplankton they infect. However, many of the viruses infecting phytoplankton, in particular eukaryotic algae, can be found in members of the family phycodnaviridae, a diverse family of large icosahedral viruses with clear importance in their respective aquatic environments. Additionally, many of these viruses may be classified as Giant Viruses. Another key group of phytoplankton viruses are Cyanophages, phages that infect cyanobacteria. The first cyanophage isolated, LPP-1, in the family podoviridae, is small compared to the large size characterizing many members of family phycondnaviridae. Some other types of phytoplankton viruses include but are not limited to; Algal viruses, Coccolithoviruses, Dinoflaggelate Viruses, Cyanophages and Diatom viruses.

=== Phycovirus history ===
Phycoviruses, an overarching category phycodnaviridae belongs to, are viruses that target eukaryotic phytoplankton and were first identified back in 1963 in Indiana. Despite this early discovery, research progress in this field was slow compared to viruses affecting humans, animals, or crops. However, these viruses have a significant impact on the growth and breakdown of algal communities, resulting in more recent research interest. One key focus has been on how they contribute to regulation of algal populations, preventing them from growing out of control. Interestingly, many of the first Phycoviruses found were those targeting blue-green algae, often found in places like waste settling ponds.

=== Cyanophage history ===
Studies on cyanophages were initially focused on freshwater from which the first isolation of a cyanophage occurred in 1963. From the period of 1970-1990, there was extensive research into the genetics of cyanophages allowing for a better understanding of their biology. After the 1990s, research focuses changed to phage host interactions and determining the diversity of these marine viruses.

=== Ecological significance of phytoplankton viruses ===
Phytoplankton viruses play an important ecological role in controlling phytoplankton blooms and are often one of the primary reasons behind their regulation and termination during the spring bloom through infection and lysis of phytoplankton. Additionally, phytoplankton viruses have been shown to influence genetic diversity and strain succession within host populations when standing stocks are maintained. Lastly, lysis of phytoplankton by viruses impacts the microbial food web as this process results in increased nutrients and dissolved organic matter being made available in the lower components of the food chain. Overall this results in changes to the carbon budget of the ocean.

However, the nature of phytoplankton-virus interactions has been shown to vary based on a series of abiotic conditions such as temperature, salinity, nutrients and light, and impact infection processes at various points in the viral life cycle. These factors influence the coexistence relationship of phytoplankton and their viruses through the variation in viral life history traits and modulation of viral life cycles.

=== Economic value of phytoplankton viruses ===
Phytoplankton viruses have a significant economic role, specifically In their management of phytoplankton blooms. This is due to the manner in which these blooms can produce harmful toxins that not only negatively impact the aquatic ecosystem but may have further impacts on economics and human health.

== Bacterial parasites of phytoplankton ==
The diversity of bacteria-phytoplankton relationships widely spans from mutualistic to parasitic. In this context, the intricacies of bacteria-phytoplankton relationships becomes crucial for comprehending the dynamics of the global carbon cycle and nutrient cycling in marine ecosystems.

Studies in effort to comprehend the impact of bacterial parasites suggest that the presence of potentially parasitic bacteria in sea water can be both positive and negative. This section explores such bacterial-phytoplankton interactions and its impact on community composition, revealing patterns of cooperative and competitive dynamics within the two.

=== From mutualism to parasitism ===
During upwelling processes, microalgae-bacteria relationship becomes very complex, switching from the initial mutualism to parasitism. This shift is dependent on the physiological state of the microalga involved.

the interactions between microalgae and microorganisms offer potential benefits, particularly in aquaculture. These interactions can enhance algal biomass with valuable compounds like lipids and carbohydrates. Below is a table providing examples of microalgae-bacteria interactions that lead to positive biomass production.

Table 1. Examples of positive microalgae-bacteria interactions
Microglia	Bacterium	Mediators from microalgae	Mediators from bacteria
Algal growth improvement / production cost decrease
E. huxleyi	P. gallaeciensis	Dimethylsulphonio-propionate	Promotors and antibiotics
B. braunii	Rhizobium sp.		Acyl-homoserine lactones (AHLs)
L.rostrate	M. loti		Vitamin B_{12}
T. pseudonana CCMP1335	R. pomeroyi DSS-3	2,3-dihydroxy-propane-1-sulfonate	Vitamin B_{12}
S. trochoidea	Marinobacter	Organic molecules	Vibrioferrin
S. trochoidea	Roseobacter	Organic molecules	Vibrioferrin
N. oleoabundans	A. vinelandii		Siderophore
Scenedesmus sp.	A. vinelandii		Siderophore
Accumulation of fatty acids and lipids
C. vulgaris	A. brasilense		Siderophore mediated nitrogen fixation
Heterotrophic accumulation of starch and carbohydrates
C. vulgaris	A. brasilense		Siderophore mediated nitrogen fixation
C. sorokiniana	A. brasilense		Siderophore mediated nitrogen fixation
Photoautotrophic accumulation of starch and carbohydrates
C. vulgaris	A. brasilense		Siderophore mediated nitrogen fixation
C. sorokiniana	A. brasilense		Siderophore mediated nitrogen fixation

Phaeobacter gallaeciensis BS107 is a member of the roseobacter clade, a significant group of marine α-proteobacteria making up to a quarter of bacteria in coastal communities. It interacts with Emiliania huxleyi, a widely distributed microalga crucial for seasonal algal blooms and oxygen production. The relationship between P. gallaeciensis BS107 and E. huxleyi is dynamic. The bacteria alternates between mutualistic and parasitic phases. In the mutualistic phase, both benefit mutually, with the algal host providing a surface for biofilm formation and nutrients, and the bacterium offering protection and growth promotion. However, when the algal host begins to senesce, it releases compounds triggering the bacterium to secrete selective algaecides to the host, leading to a parasitic phase where the bacterium benefits from the host's demise.

This fluidity in the relationship highlights the dynamic nature of microalgae-bacteria interactions, where they can oscillate between co-operation and exploitation based on environmental and biological conditions.

=== Algicidal bacteria and its impact on algal blooms ===
Extensive research on algicidal bacteria has been done to mitigate harmful algal blooms (HABs) or excessive algae growth. Although the cause of HABs is not yet perfectly understood, the presence of algicidal bacteria often coincides with the decline of algal blooms, which hints that there is potential role of algicidal bacteria in shaping algal bloom dynamics.

Parasitic bacteria Vampirovibrio chlorellavorus is an example of an algicidal bacteria. The predatory bacterium Vampirovibrio poses a significant threat to Chlorella cultures, leading to rapid deterioration and collapse of (micro)algal populations. This bacterium, although playing a crucial ecological role in maintaining an optimal population of Chlorella in natural settings, can have devastating effects on large-scale algal ponds, which are vital for aquaculture and other valuable products.

When Chlorella cultures are exposed to pH 3.5 for 15 minutes in the presence of acetate, which has a bactericidal effect that significantly reduces aerobic bacterial counts, it effectively prevents culture crashes and doubles the productive longevity of the cultures. Another possible measure to prevent Vampirovibrio infection of Chlorella is the induction in the production of small bioactive peptides and glycosides by Chlorella under iron limitation.

=== Factors influencing prevalence of bacterial parasites ===
There is apparent seasonal differences in prevalence amongst many parasite groups. The bacterial parasites such as Spirobacillus and Pasteuria, always reached their highest prevalence in summer.

Waterbody morphology can explain the varied host exposure levels that lead to the parasitic stages. For example, Spirabacillus requires turbulence after its parasitic stage or host decomposition in order to reattach with the next living host. Turbulence is affected by depth, surface area or basin shape, and shallow habitats are more subject to wind-induced turbulence, leading to higher overall prevalence of bacterial parasites.

== Ecological importance ==
=== Regulating population dynamics ===
Parasites can have major influences on regulating the populations of phytoplankton communities. By infecting and killing their specific hosts, parasites can directly influence and reduce population numbers contributing to maintaining the biodiversity of an ecosystem. Thereby, they assure there is no prolonged dominance of one phytoplankton species in a given community, ensuring the ecosystem can remain stable.

=== Influencing carbon sequestration ===
Due to the fact that phytoplankton are the primary producers of their environments they generate the organic carbon for their ecosystem. As planktonic parasites control the abundance of their hosts they can also indirectly influence the rate of carbon sequestration in their environment which then shifts the export of carbon to the deep ocean and impacts the global carbon cycle.

=== Nutrient cycling ===
Parasitic infection also contributes to the stable nutrient circulation throughout the water column. When parasites infect their hosts they can lyse (disintegrate) and kill the host, releasing the organic matter and nutrients, such as carbon and nitrogen, stored within host cells back into the surrounding water. This process is called the viral shunt; and contributes to ensuring that nutrients can be readily available for other microorganisms filling the lower trophic levels of food webs. With more nutrients available for these microorganisms, higher trophic levels will be able to be sustained, maintaining a balanced ecosystem.

=== Maintaining diversity and evolution ===
Organisms are continuously evolving and adapting to changing environments, and many parasites are host specific which is constantly driving the need for parasites to evolve alongside their hosts. Oftentimes, organisms are being driven to evolve defense mechanisms against their parasites, leading parasites to coevolve strategies in which they can continue to infect their hosts. Evolution is a constant battle against selective pressures and environmental changes, and parasite-host coevolution allows for organisms to generate more genetic diversity promoting species survival.
