= Chlorovirus =

Virus classification
- (unranked): Virus
- Realm: Varidnaviria
- Kingdom: Bamfordvirae
- Phylum: Nucleocytoviricota
- Class: Megaviricetes
- Order: Algavirales
- Family: Phycodnaviridae
- Genus: Chlorovirus

Genus of viruses

Chlorovirus, also known as Chlorella virus, is a genus of giant double-stranded DNA viruses, in the family Phycodnaviridae. This genus is found globally in freshwater environments where freshwater microscopic algae serve as natural hosts. There are 20 species in 3 subgenera in this genus.

Chlorovirus was discovered in 1981 by Russel H. Meints, James L. Van Etten, Daniel Kuczmarski, Kit Lee, and Barbara Ang while attempting to culture Chlorella-like algae. During the attempted process viral particles were discovered in the cells 2 to 6 hours after being initially isolated, followed by lysis after 12 to 20 hours. This virus was initially called HVCV (Hydra viridis Chlorella virus) since it was first found to infect Chlorella-like algae.

Though relatively new to virologists and thus not extensively studied, one species, Chlorovirus ATCV-1, commonly found in lakes, has been recently found to infect humans. New studies focusing on effects of infection in mouse model are currently emerging as well.

== Taxonomy ==
Chlorovirus is a genus of giant double-stranded DNA (dsDNA) viruses in the family Phycodnaviridae, and Baltimore group 1: dsDNA viruses. The genus contains the following species, listed by subgenus and scientific name and followed by the exemplar virus of the species:

- Subgenus: Alphachlorovirus

- Chlorovirus alphaalkalinus, Chlorovirus O-NE-11
- Chlorovirus alphagardense, Chlorovirus O-NE-13
- Chlorovirus alphanebraskense, Chlorovirus N-NE-4
- Chlorovirus americanus, Paramecium bursaria Chlorella virus NY2A
- Chlorovirus primosyngense, Only-Syngen Nebraska virus
- Chlorovirus syngense, Chlorovirus O-NE-18
- Chlorovirus vanettense, Paramecium bursaria Chlorella virus 1

- Subgenus: Betachlorovirus

- Chlorovirus betanebraskense, Paramecium bursaria Chlorella virus CZ-2
- Chlorovirus conductrix, Paramecium bursaria Chlorella virus A1
- Chlorovirus longinquus, Paramecium bursaria Chlorella virus NE-JV-1

- Subgenus: Gammachlorovirus

- Chlorovirus arcticum, Chlorovirus GNLD-22
- Chlorovirus gammagardense, Chlorovirus S-NE-18
- Chlorovirus gammanebraskense, Acanthocystis turfacea Chlorella virus NTS-1
- Chlorovirus guatemalense, Acanthocystis turfacea Chlorella virus GM0701.1
- Chlorovirus heliozoae, Acanthocystis turfacea chlorella virus 1
- Chlorovirus insulalacus, Chlorovirus S-NE-11
- Chlorovirus minnesotense, Acanthocystis turfacea Chlorella virus MN0810.1
- Chlorovirus multilacus, Acanthocystis turfacea Chlorella virus Canal-1
- Chlorovirus novaeterrae, Acanthocystis turfacea Chlorella virus Br0604L
- Chlorovirus solusgardense, Chlorovirus S-NE-20

== Ecology ==
Chloroviruses are widespread in freshwater environments in all parts of the globe and have been isolated from freshwater sources in Europe, Asia, Australia, as well as North and South America. Natural hosts of chloroviruses include various types of unicellular eukaryotic Chlorella-like algae, with individual virus species typically infecting only within a distinct strain. These algal hosts are known to establish endosymbiotic relationships with larger protists, such as Paramecium bursaria (a member of the ciliates), Acanthocystis turfacea (a centroheliozoan) and Hydra viridis (member of the hydrozoa). While an individual protist can harbour up to several hundred algal cells at any given time, free-floating algae are highly susceptible to chloroviruses, indicating that such endosymbiosis serves to provide resistance from infection.

Chlorovirus titers are variable by season and location, but typically fluctuate between 1 and 100 PFU/mL, although high abundances of up to 100,000 PFU/mL may occur in some environments. Due to the rich genetic diversity and high specialization of individual species with respect to infectious range, variations in their ecology are not unusual, resulting in unique spatio-temporal patterns, which ultimately depend on lifestyle and nature of the host. As such, previous survey data highlighted two prominent seasonal abundance peaks for both Chlorella variabilis NC64A and Chlorella variabilis Syngen viruses — one in late fall, and the other in late spring to mid-summer — which is likely attributed to the fact that they share a host species. Conversely, Chlorella heliozoae SAG viruses peaked at different times of the year and generally exhibited more variability in titers, as compared to the NC64A and Syngen viruses. Additionally, studies revealed that chloroviruses demonstrate some resilience in response to decreased temperatures observed during the winter season, characterized by presence of infectious particles under ice layers in a stormwater management pond in Ontario, Canada. Further, DeLong et al. (2016) suggest that predation by small crustaceans can play an indirect role in titer fluctuations, as degradation of protist cells passing through the digestive tract results in liberation of large numbers of unicellular algae that become susceptible to viral infection due to disruption of endosymbiosis. Overall, seasonal abundance of chloroviruses depends not only on the host species, but also on the abundance of other microorganisms, general nutrient status and ecological conditions.

Collectively, chloroviruses are able to mediate global biogeochemical cycles through phytoplankton turnover. Chlorella, in co-occurrence with other types of microscopic algae like Microcystis aeruginosa, are known to cause toxic algal blooms that typically last from February to June in the Northern hemisphere, resulting in oxygen depletion and deaths of larger organisms in freshwater habitats. Lytic infection of unicellular algae by chloroviruses results in termination of algal blooms and the subsequent release of carbon, nitrogen and phosphorus trapped in the cells, transporting them to lower trophic levels and, ultimately, fueling the food chain.

== Structure ==
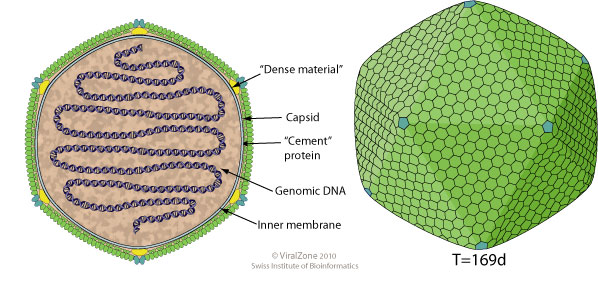
Schematic drawing of a typical Phycodnaviridae virion (cross section and side view, not showing spike and vertex)

Viruses in the genus Chlorovirus are enveloped, with icosahedral and spherical geometries, and T=169 (triangulation number) symmetry. The diameter is around 100-220 nm. Genomes are linear, usually single-copy, composed of dsDNA (double-stranded DNA), and around 330 kb in length. The dsDNA is closed with a hairpin structure terminus. Genomes also often have several hundred open reading frames. As a group, chloroviruses encode from 632 protein families; however, each individual virus only has 330 to 416 protein encoding genes. As part of the DNA modification systems, chloroviruses have methylated bases in specific sections of their DNA sequence. Some chloroviruses also contain introns and inteins, though this is rare within the genus.

Paramecium bursaria Chlorella virus 1 (PBCV-1) have a 190 nm diameter and a fivefold axis. One face's juncture has a protruding spike, which is the first part of the virus to contact its host. The outer capsid covers a single lipid bilayer membrane, which is obtained from the host's endoplasmic reticulum. Some capsomers on the external shell have fibres extending away from the virus to aid in host attachment.

== Hosts ==
Chloroviruses infect certain unicellular, eukaryotic chlorella-like green algae, called zoochlorellae, and are very species and even strain specific. These zoochlorellae commonly establish endosymbiotic relationships with the protozoan Paramecium bursaria, the coelenterate Hydra viridis, the heliozoon Acanthocystis turfacea and other freshwater and marine invertebrates and protozoans. The viruses cannot infect zoochlorellae when they are in their symbiotic phase, and there is no evidence that zoochlorellae grow free of their hosts in indigenous waters. Chloroviruses have also recently been found to infect people, leading to studies on infections in mice as well.

== Life cycle ==
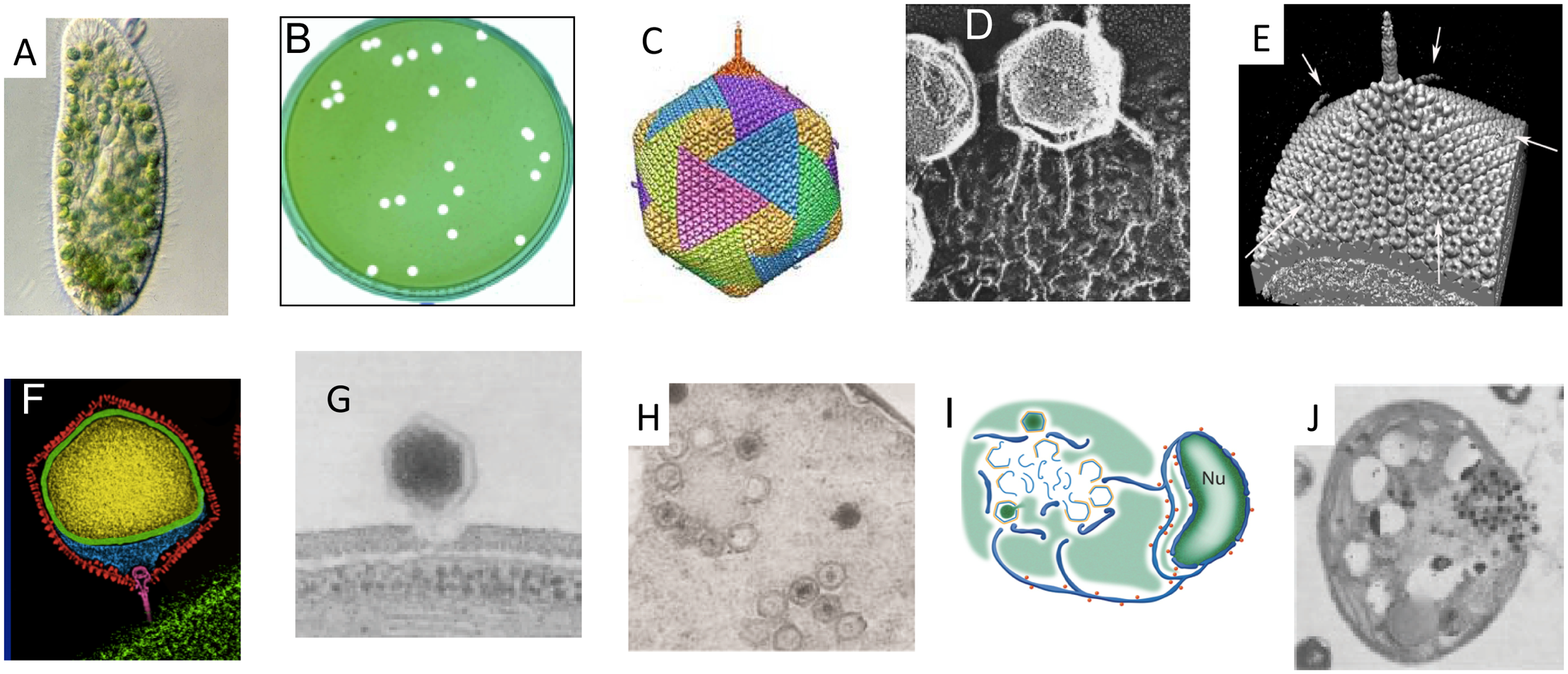
Chlorella cells and chlorovirus Paramecium bursaria chlorella virus (PBCV-1) (A) PBCV-1 and its symbiotic chlorella cells. (B) Plaques formed as a result of PBCV-1 on Chlorella variabilis. ( C) 5 times averaged electron micrograph of PBCV-1 displayins a long narrow spike at one of its verticies with fibres extending. (D) PBCV-1 attached to the cell wall. (E) Surface view of PBCV-1 spike/fibres. (F) Initial attachment of PBCV-1 to a C. variabilis cell. (G) Digestion of the cell wall once PBCV-1 has attached (1-3 minutes postinfection). (H) Virion particles assembling within the cytoplasm, marking virus assembly centers approximately 4 hours post infection. (I) Depiction of PBCV-1 assembling into infectious particles. (J) Localized lysis of cell wall/plasma membrane, and release of progeny viruses approximately 8 hours postinfection.

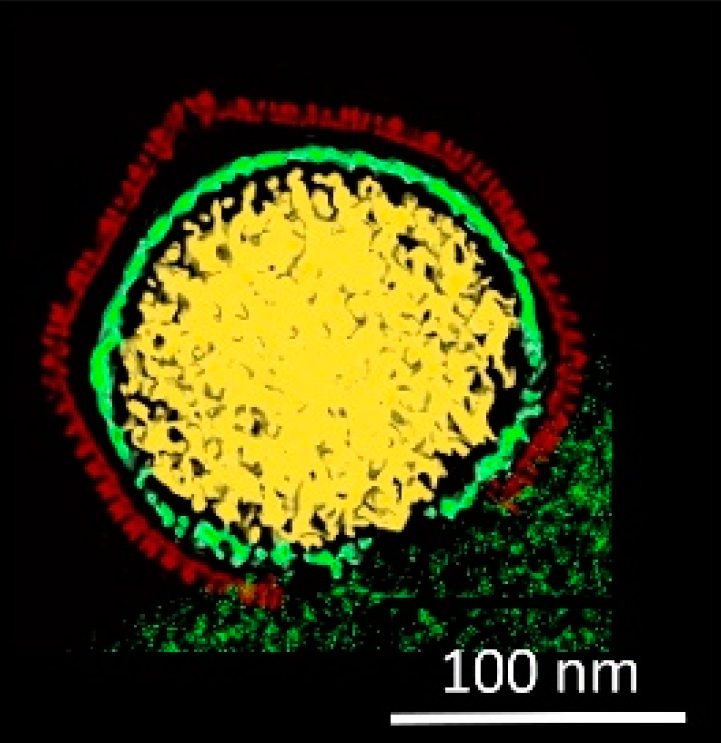
Cross-section of a five-fold averaged cryo-EM of PBCV-1 as the virus is getting ready to release its DNA into the host cell.

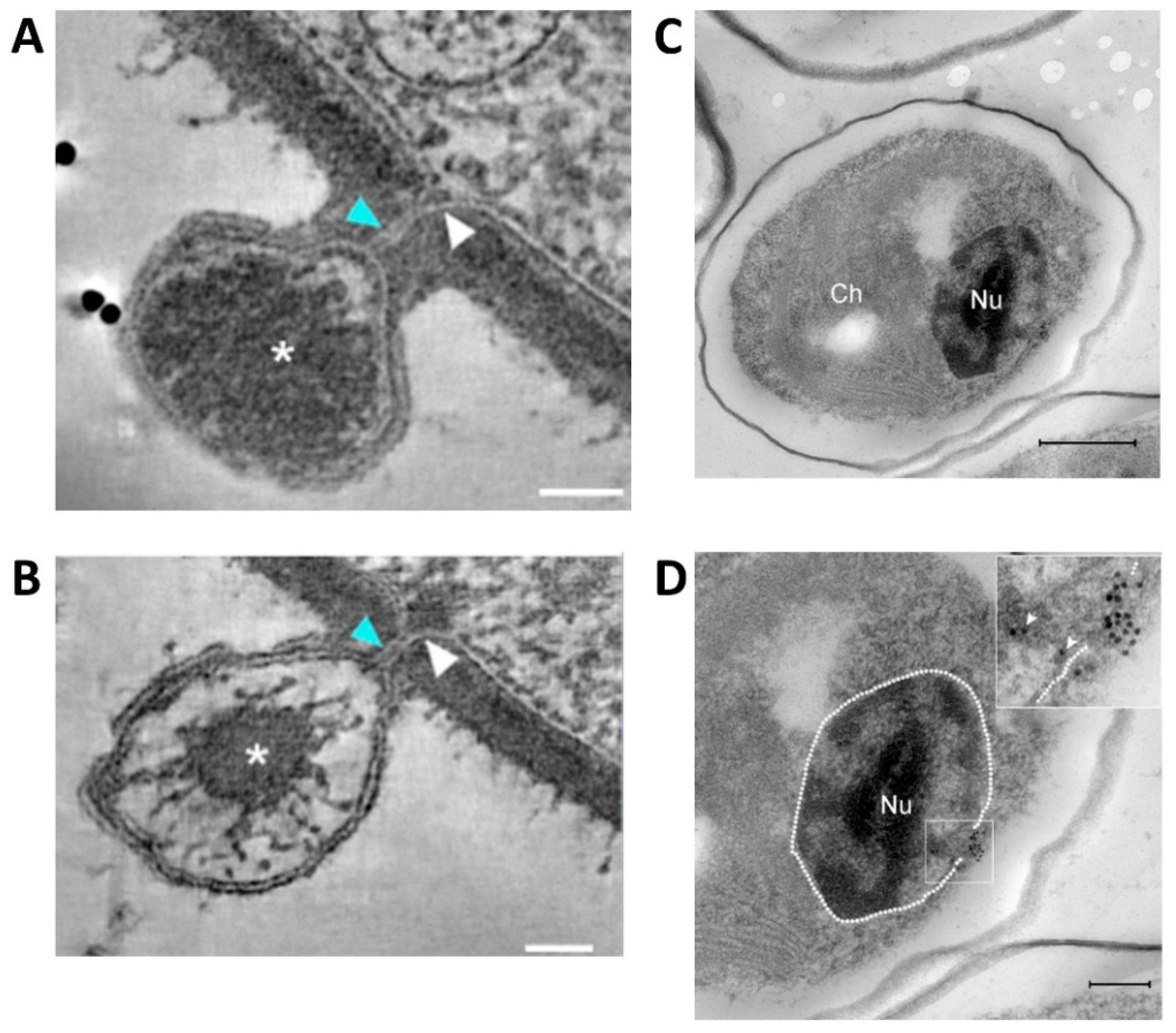
PBCV-1 infected chlorella cells at 1.5–2 min p.i. were examined by Scanning-Transmission Electron Microscopy (STEM) tomography. The membrane-lined channel connecting the virus genome with the interior of the host is clearly visible.

In three dimensional recreations of PBCV-1, it is seen that the spike first contacts the host’s cell wall and is aided by fibres in order to secure the virus to the host. The attachment of PBCV-1 to its receptor is very specific, and a major source of limitation with regards to viral host range. Virus-associated enzymes allow the host cell wall to degrade, and the viral internal membrane fuses with the host membrane. This fusion allows the transfer of viral DNA and virion-associated proteins into the host cell and also triggers depolarization of the host membrane. This is presumably occurring due to a virus encoded K+ channel. Studies predict this channel is within the virus, acting as an internal membrane releasing K+ from the cell, which may assist in the ejection of viral DNA and proteins from the viral cell to its host. The depolarization of the host’s cell membrane is also thought to prevent secondary infection from another virus or secondary transporters.

Because PBCV-1 does not have an RNA polymerase gene, its DNA and viral-associated proteins move to the nucleus where transcription begins 5–10 minutes post infection. This rapid transcription is attributed to some component facilitating this transfer or viral DNA to the nucleus. This component is assumed to be a product of the PBCV-a443r gene, which obtains structures resembling proteins involved in nuclear trafficking in mammalian cells.

Host transcription rates decrease in this early phase of infection, and host transcription facilitators are reprogrammed to transcribe the new viral DNA. Minutes after infection, host chromosomal DNA degradation begins. This is presumed to occur through PBCV-1 encoded and packaged DNA restriction endonucleases. Degradation of the host chromosomal DNA inhibits host transcription. This results in 33-55% of the polyadenylated mRNAs in the infected cell being of viral origin by 20 minutes after initial infection.

Viral DNA replication initiates after 60 to 90 minutes, which is then followed by the transcription of late genes within the host cell. Roughly 2–3 hours post infection, the assembly of virus capsids begins. This occurs within localized regions of the cytoplasm, with the virus capsids becoming prominent 3–4 hours after initial infection. 5–6 hours after PBCV-1 infection, the cytoplasm of the host cell fills with infectious progeny virus particles. Shortly after that (6–8 hours post infection), localized lysis of the host cell releases progeny. ~1000 particles are released from each infected cell, ~30% of which form plaques.

== Effects of infection ==
In algae infected with Cloroviruses the result is lysis, and thus death. As such, Chloroviruses are an important mechanism to the termination of algal blooms and play a vital role in the supply of nutrients to the water column (See Ecology section for more information). Chloroviruses are also able to change the wall structure of infected cells. Some chloroviruses contain chitin synthase (CHS) genes while some others contain hyaluronan synthase (HAS) genes, respectively triggering the formation of chitin sensitive fibres or hyaluronan sensitive fibres. Though the function of producing a fibrous mat is not definitively known, it is believed that the fibres could: deter the uptake of the infected cell by symbiotic protozoans, which cause the digestion of the lysed cell; infect another host that takes up the fibre covered algae; or join with other infected and fibre covered cells. The ability to encode enzymes that trigger the synthesis of hyaluronan (hyaluronic acid) is found in no other viruses.

Recently, chlorovirus ATCV-1 DNA has been found in human oropharyngeal samples. Prior to this is it was not known chlorovirus could infect humans, so there is limited knowledge about infections in people. People who were found to be infected had delayed memory and decreased attention. Humans found to be infected with ATCV-1 showed a decreased visual processing ability and reduced visual motor speed. This led to an overall decline in the ability to perform tasks based on vision and spatial reasoning.

Studies infecting mice with ACTV-1 have been performed following the discovery chlorovirus can infect humans. The studies conducted on infected mice show changes in the Cdk5 pathway, which aids with learning and memory formation, as well as alterations in gene expression in the dopamine pathway. Further, infected mice were found to be less social, interacting less with newly introduced companion mice than the control group. Infected mice also spent longer in a light-exposed portion of a test chamber, where the control mice tended to prefer the dark side and avoided the light. This indicates a decrease in anxiety with ACTV-1 infection. The test mice were also less able to recognize an object that had been moved from its previous location, showing a decrease in spatial reference memory. As in humans, there is a decrease in vision spatial task ability. Within the hippocampus (area of brain responsible for memory and learning), changes in gene expression occur, and infection presents a change in the pathways of immune cell functioning and antigen processing. It has been suggested that this possibly indicates an immune system response to the ACTV-1 virus causing inflammation which may be the cause for the cognitive impairments. The symptoms presented may also suggest hippocampus and medial prefrontal cortex interference from ACTV-1 infection.

== Evolution ==
Chloroviruses, as well as the remaining members of the family Phycodnaviridae, are considered part of the broader group of microbes called nucleocytoplasmic large DNA viruses (NCLDVs). Although phycodnaviruses are diverse genetically and infect different hosts, they display high levels of similarity on the structural level to each other and other NCLDVs. Phylogenetic analysis of the major capsid protein within the group indicates great likelihood of close relatedness, as well as prior divergence from a single common ancestor, which is believed to be a small DNA virus. Additionally, studies suggest that genome gigantism, characteristic of all chloroviruses, is a property which evolved early on in the history of NCLDVs, and subsequent adaptations towards respective hosts and particular habitats resulted in mutations and gene loss events, which ultimately shaped all currently existing chlorovirus species.

Genome sequencing and functional screening of proteins from PBCV-1 and ATCV-1 revealed large number of horizontally transferred genes, which indicates a long history of co-evolution with the unicellular host and lateral gene transfer with other seemingly unrelated organisms. Further, both viruses were found to encode several so-called "progenitor enzymes", which are smaller, but less specialized than their modern-day analogues. For example, one of the sugar-manipulating enzymes in PBCV-1 (GDP-d-mannose 4,6 dehydratase or GMD) was shown to mediate catalysis of not only the dehydration of GDP-d-mannose, but also reduction of the sugar molecule produced in the initially predicted process. Such dual functionality is uncommon among the currently existing sugar-manipulating enzymes, and possibly suggests the ancient nature of the PBCV-1 GMD.

Infection cycle studies in PBCV-1 revealed that the virus relies on a unique capsid glycosylation process independent of the host's ER or Golgi machinery. This feature has not yet been observed in any other virus currently known to science and potentially represents an ancient and conserved pathway, which could have evolved before eukaryogenesis, which was estimated to occur around 2.0-2.7 billion years ago.

Recent discovery regarding presence of DNA sequences homologous to ATCV-1 in the human oropharyngeal virome, as well as the subsequent studies demonstrating successful infection of mammalian animal model by ATCV-1, also point to the likelihood of ancient evolutionary history of chloroviruses, which possess structural features and utilize molecular mechanisms that potentially allow for replication within diverse animal hosts.
