= Algal virus =

Virus that infects algae

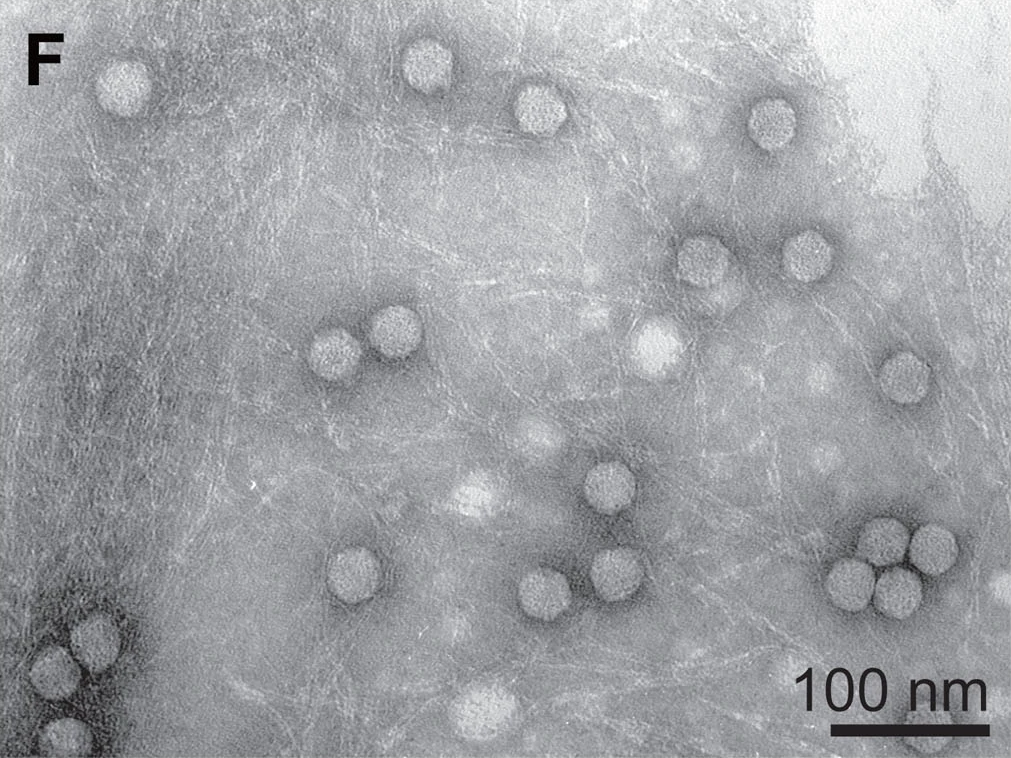
TEM micrograph of ultra-thin sections of Chaetoceros setoensis and negatively stained Chaetoceros setoensis DNA virus (CsetDNAV) particles, genus Diatodnavirus: (F) Negatively stained CsetDNAV particles in the culture lysate.

Algal viruses are viruses that specifically infect the photosynthetic, single-celled eukaryotes known as algae. As of 2020, there were 61 viruses known to infect algae. Algae are integral components of aquatic food webs and drive nutrient cycling, so the viruses infecting algal populations also impacts the organisms and nutrient cycling systems that depend on them. Thus, these viruses can have significant, worldwide economic and ecological effects. Their genomes varied between 4.4 and 560 kilobase pairs (kbp) long and used double-stranded deoxyribonucleic acid (dsDNA), double-stranded ribonucleic acid (dsRNA), single-stranded deoxyribonucleic acid (ssDNA), and single-stranded ribonucleic acid (ssRNA). The viruses ranged between 20 and 210 nm in diameter. Since the discovery of the first algae-infecting virus in 1979, several different techniques have been used to find new viruses infecting algae and it seems that there are many algae-infecting viruses left to be discovered

== DNA viruses ==
DNA viruses are viruses that store their genomic information using DNA, and are the best studied subgrouping of algae-infecting viruses. This is especially true for the dsDNA virus family, Phycodnaviridae. However, other groups of dsDNA viruses including giant viruses belonging to the family Mimiviridae also infect algae. A recent survey of 65 algal genomes revealed that some viruses belonging to the nucleocytoplasmic large DNA viruses (NCLDV), the larger viral group containing both the Phycodnaviridae and Mimiviridae viral families, had integrated themselves into 24 of the host’s genomes. Recently, ssDNA viruses, like the group of diatom infecting viruses Bacilladnaviridae, have been discovered

== RNA viruses ==
RNA viruses also attack algal hosts. There are dsRNA viruses like those belonging to the Reoviridae family that infect Micromonas pusilla and ssRNA viruses like those belonging to the genus Bacillarnavirus that infect the diatom Chaetoceros tenuissimus. Incorporation of RNA virus genes into algal genomes has also been reported. Genes from single stranded dinoflagellate-infecting viruses have been detected in the genomes of the coral endosymbiotic algae, Symbiodinium.

== Diatom viruses ==
Diatoms are among the most common phytoplankton groups found within marine and freshwater systems. They are estimated to consist of roughly 12,000-13,000 species which account for 35-70% of marine primary production within the ocean and nearly 20% of the world's primary productivity. Diatoms, among other primary important producers, can be susceptible to viral infection. Diatom viruses are a group of viruses that infect diatoms and have potentially been shown to impact population dynamics and mortality rates within diatom populations significantly. Diatom viruses are highly diverse and can have a variety of complex interactions with their specific host cells; they have also been known to have the ability to cause cell lysis and nutrient release demonstrating their significant ecological impact with regard to their potential to release nutrients into the ecosystem and regulate diatom populations.

=== Diatom virus discovery ===
The discovery of diatom viruses dates back to the early 1970s, when scientists first observed viral-like particles in the cultures of diatoms. Moreover, it was not until the 1990s that marine viruses were found to have the ability to be potentially pathogenic towards marine organisms. The first diatom virus was identified and isolated, and characterized from the Ariake Sea of Japan in 2004 and was classified as Rhizosolenia setigera RNA virus (RsRNAV). Rhizosolenia setigera RNA virus (RsRNAV) was found to have a viral replication site of cytoplasm within the host organism. The viral particle of Rhizosolenia setigera RNA virus (RsRNAV) was found to have an icosahedral shape lacking a tail and being of a single-stranded RNA structure. Thereafter, another research study found a diatom virus which was isolated from the marine diatom Skeletonema costatum. The virus, later named the Skeletonema costatum DNA virus (ScDCV), was found to have an icosahedral capsid and a double-stranded DNA genome. Subsequently, after the discovery of Skeletonema costatum DNA virus (ScDCV), another diatom virus was isolated and characterized as the Chaetoceros setoensis DNA virus (CsetDNAV), which was found to infect the diatom Chaetoceros setoensis. The strain of the virus (CsetDNAV) was characterized and identified to be present within the diatom Chaetoceros setoensis, which was found to be located off the coast of the Seto Island Sea of Japan. The viral particle of Chaetoceros setoensis was found within the cytoplasm of the host organism, and the viral genome was found to be a closed circular ssDNA with segments of unidentified linear single-stranded nucleotides in that this specific viruses genome structure is unique in that it has not been found within any other diatom viruses. Due to the discovery of (CsetDNAV) and its unique genome structure, it is thought that other unidentified diatom viruses may possess diverse and unique viral genomic structures. Since the discovery of (CsetDNAV), various other diatom viruses have been isolated and identified, including members of the Bacilladnaviridae, Phycodnaviridae, and Picornaviridae.

=== Diatom virus transmission ===
Diatom viruses are believed to be primarily transported through horizontal gene transmission. Horizontal gene transmission within diatom viruses occurs when a diatom virus infects a diatom and then spreads to other diatoms via direct contact or through interactions within the water column. Diatom viruses are highly infectious and have the ability to spread rapidly within diatom populations leading to significant changes in the growth and physiology of the organism. The transmission of diatom viruses can be potentially explained by the fact that diatoms are known to form large colonies or chains, which provides diatom viruses with ample opportunity to infect and spread within new host organisms. Additionally, some diatom viruses have been shown to have the capability of vertical transmission in which they can be passed from a parent diatom to a diatom offspring. The form of vertical transmission is thought to allow diatom viruses to persist over long periods of time and may influence the evolution and genetic diversity of diatom populations. The mechanisms of this type of transmission are not fully understood, but it is thought that this form of transmission is facilitated via asexual reproduction and cell division within diatoms.

=== Taxonomy ===
The following families are recognized.

- Bacilladnaviridae
- Phycodnaviridae
- Picornaviridae

== Applications ==
=== Algae-sourced biodiesel ===
Algal viruses have the potential to be used for the production of alternative energy sources to fossil fuels. More specifically, algal viruses can be used as a tool during the process of biodiesel production sourced from green microalgae and cyanobacteria. This is given that green algae and cyanobacteria contain components necessary for the creation of biofuels. In particular, both green algal cells and cyanobacteria produce cellular products known as lipids. The lipids contain triglycerides of which are directly used to make biodiesel. However, green microalgae and cyanobacteria have not been used for the standard commercial production of biodiesel due to the difficulty in extracting adequate yields of lipids from these sources.

==== Use in biodiesel production ====
Using algal viruses as a pretreatment on green microalgae has been found to be an effective procedural change for the lipid extraction process. This particular algal virus was used given its characterized ability to infect and replicate inside of unicellular Chlorella algal cells. After lytic algal viruses infect their cell host, they replicate and assemble mature virions that lyse the host algal cell for release. The degradation of the cell wall of the algal host cell by the mature algal viruses inside of the cell is the key factor that makes for a more efficient lipid extraction from the algal cells.

=== Controlling algal blooms ===
In nature, algal viruses have been observed to play an ecological role in algal bloom demise. Given this, scientists have proposed that algal viruses have the potential to be used as biological treatments for algal bloom control. For example, a particular algal virus, known as a cyanophage, can be used to control harmful algal blooms of cyanobacteria. Lytic cyanophages are often found in the presence of Microcystis cyanobacteria. Specifically, the impact that cyanophages have on the population control of Microcystis aeruginosa has been a topic of interest given that this species of cyanobacteria is commonly responsible for harmful algal blooms. In one lab study, M. aeruginosa was collected and then treated with cyanophage that was found in the presence of M. aeruginosa in a lake. After six days, the M. aeruginosa algal biomass had decreased by 95 percent. The results of another lab study showed that cyanophages maintain their observed function of algal bloom demise in a controlled eutrophic setting. In this case, the biomass of M. aeruginosa also greatly decreased when treated with cyanophages. A negative correlation between M. aeruginosa and cyanophage has also been recorded in a natural setting. In the freshwater body, Lake Mikata, researchers analyzed samples of M. aeruginosa algal growth and found that the biomass of M. aeruginosa decreased in relation to an increase in cyanophage population density.
