= Phaeovirus =

Virus classification
- (unranked): Virus
- Realm: Varidnaviria
- Kingdom: Bamfordvirae
- Phylum: Nucleocytoviricota
- Class: Megaviricetes
- Order: Algavirales
- Family: Phycodnaviridae
- Genus: Phaeovirus

Genus of viruses

Phaeovirus is a genus of viruses, in the family Phycodnaviridae. Algae serve as natural hosts. There are three species in this genus.

== Taxonomy ==
The genus contains the following species, listed by scientific name and followed by the exemplar virus of the species:

- Phaeovirus feldmanniae, Ectocarpus siliculosus virus 1
- Phaeovirus irregularis, Feldmannia irregularis virus a
- Phaeovirus unasiliculosus, Feldmannia species virus

== Structure ==
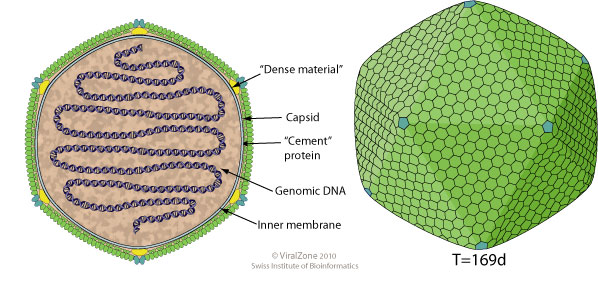
Schematic drawing of a typical Phycodnaviridae virion (cross section and side view)

Viruses in Phaeovirus are enveloped, with icosahedral and round geometries, and T=169 symmetry. The diameter is around 120-150 nm. Genomes are linear, around 150-350kb in length.

Genus	Structure	Symmetry	Capsid	Genomic arrangement	Genomic segmentation
Phaeovirus	Icosahedral	T=169	Enveloped	Linear	Monopartite

== Life cycle ==
Viral replication is nucleo-cytoplasmic, and is lysogenic. Replication follows the DNA strand displacement model. DNA-templated transcription is the method of transcription. The virus exits the host cell by lysis via lytic phospholipids. Alga serve as the natural host. Transmission routes are passive diffusion.

Genus	Host details	Tissue tropism	Entry details	Release details	Replication site	Assembly site	Transmission
Phaeovirus	Alga	None	Cell receptor endocytosis	Lysis	Nucleus	Cytoplasm	Passive diffusion
