= Prymnesiovirus =

Virus classification
- (unranked): Virus
- Realm: Varidnaviria
- Kingdom: Bamfordvirae
- Phylum: Nucleocytoviricota
- Class: Megaviricetes
- Order: Algavirales
- Family: Phycodnaviridae
- Genus: Prymnesiovirus

Genus of viruses

Prymnesiovirus is a genus of viruses, in the family Phycodnaviridae. Alga serve as natural hosts. There is only one species in this genus: Chrysochromulina brevifilum virus PW1 (CbV-PW1, Prymnesiovirus brevifilum). It infects Haptolina brevifila, basionym: Chrysochromulina brevifilum (Edvardsen et al., 2011).

== Structure ==
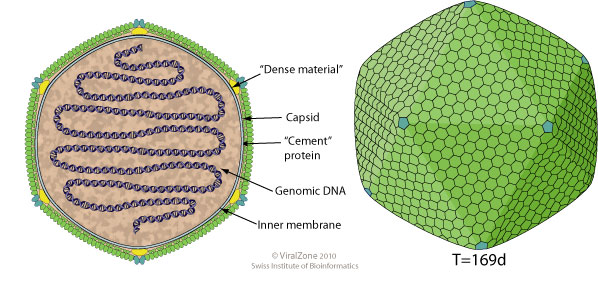
Schematic drawing of a typical Phycodnaviridae virion (cross section and side view)

Viruses in Prymnesiovirus are enveloped, with icosahedral and round geometries, and T=169 symmetry. The diameter is around 100-170 nm. Genomes are linear, around 120-485kb in length.

Genus	Structure	Symmetry	Capsid	Genomic arrangement	Genomic segmentation
Prymnesiovirus	Icosahedral	T=169	Enveloped	Linear	Monopartite

== Life cycle ==
Viral replication is nucleo-cytoplasmic. Replication follows the DNA strand displacement model. DNA-templated transcription is the method of transcription. The virus exits the host cell by lysis via lytic phospholipids. Alga serve as the natural host. Transmission routes are passive diffusion.

Genus	Host details	Tissue tropism	Entry details	Release details	Replication site	Assembly site	Transmission
Prymnesiovirus	Alga	None	Cell receptor endocytosis	Lysis	Nucleus	Cytoplasm	Passive diffusion
