= Raphidovirus =

Virus classification
- (unranked): Virus
- Realm: Varidnaviria
- Kingdom: Bamfordvirae
- Phylum: Nucleocytoviricota
- Class: Megaviricetes
- Order: Algavirales
- Family: Phycodnaviridae
- Genus: Raphidovirus

Genus of viruses

Raphidovirus (likely misspelled Rhaphidovirus) is a genus of viruses, in the family Phycodnaviridae. Alga serve as natural hosts. There is only one species in this genus: Heterosigma akashiwo virus 01 (HaV01, Raphidovirus japonicum).

== Structure ==
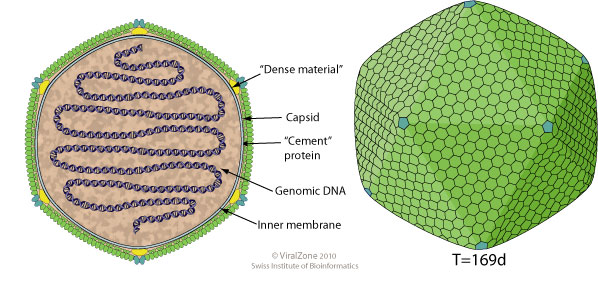
Schematic drawing of a typical Phycodnaviridae virion (cross section and side view)

Viruses in Raphidovirus are enveloped, with icosahedral and round geometries, and T=169 symmetry. The diameter is around 100-220 nm. Genomes are linear, around 295kb in length.

| Genus | Structure | Symmetry | Capsid | Genomic arrangement | Genomic segmentation |
|---|---|---|---|---|---|
| Raphidovirus | Icosahedral | T=169 | Enveloped | Linear | Monopartite |

== Life cycle ==
Viral replication is nucleo-cytoplasmic. Replication follows the DNA strand displacement model. DNA-templated transcription is the method of transcription. The virus exits the host cell by lysis via lytic phospholipids. Alga serve as the natural host. Transmission routes are passive diffusion.

| Genus | Host details | Tissue tropism | Entry details | Release details | Replication site | Assembly site | Transmission |
|---|---|---|---|---|---|---|---|
| Raphidovirus | Alga | None | Cell receptor endocytosis | Lysis | Nucleus | Cytoplasm | Passive diffusion |
