= Acanthocystis turfacea chlorella virus 1 =

Virus classification
- (unranked): Virus
- Realm: Varidnaviria
- Kingdom: Bamfordvirae
- Phylum: Nucleocytoviricota
- Class: Megaviricetes
- Order: Algavirales
- Family: Phycodnaviridae
- Genus: Chlorovirus
- Species: Chlorovirus heliozoae

Species of virus

Acanthocystis turfacea chlorella virus 1 (ATCV-1), also called Chlorovirus ATCV-1 or Chlorella virus ATCV-1 is a species of giant double-stranded DNA virus in the genus Chlorovirus.

The host of ATCV-1 is Chlorella heliozoae; it was demonstrated that "ATCV-1 neither attaches to nor infects" Chlorella variabilis.

== Risk of human infection ==
DNA from ATCV-1 has been isolated from the mucous membranes of the noses of humans. In both humans and mice, the presence of ATCV-1 on the oropharyngeal mucosa was associated with lower scores in tests of cognitive and motor skills. Injection of purified algal virus ATCV-1 intracranially results in long-lasting cognitive and behavioural effects in mice via induction of inflammatory factors.
