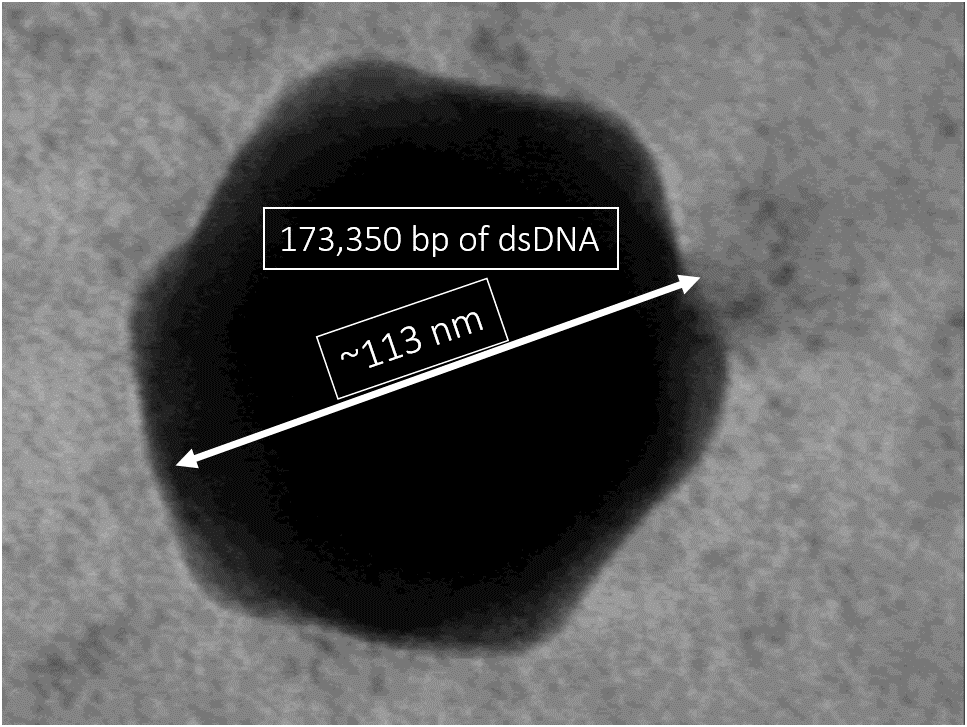
- Negative stained image of MpV-SP1

Virus classification
- (unranked): Virus
- Realm: Varidnaviria
- Kingdom: Bamfordvirae
- Phylum: Nucleocytoviricota
- Class: Megaviricetes
- Order: Algavirales
- Family: Phycodnaviridae
- Genus: Prasinovirus

= Prasinovirus =

Genus of viruses

Prasinovirus is a genus of large double-stranded DNA viruses, in the family Phycodnaviridae that infect phytoplankton in the Prasinophyceae. The genus contains two species, including Micromonas pusilla virus SP1, which infects the cosmopolitan photosynthetic flagellate Micromonas pusilla.

There is a large group of genetically diverse but related viruses that show considerable evidence of lateral gene transfer.

== Taxonomy ==
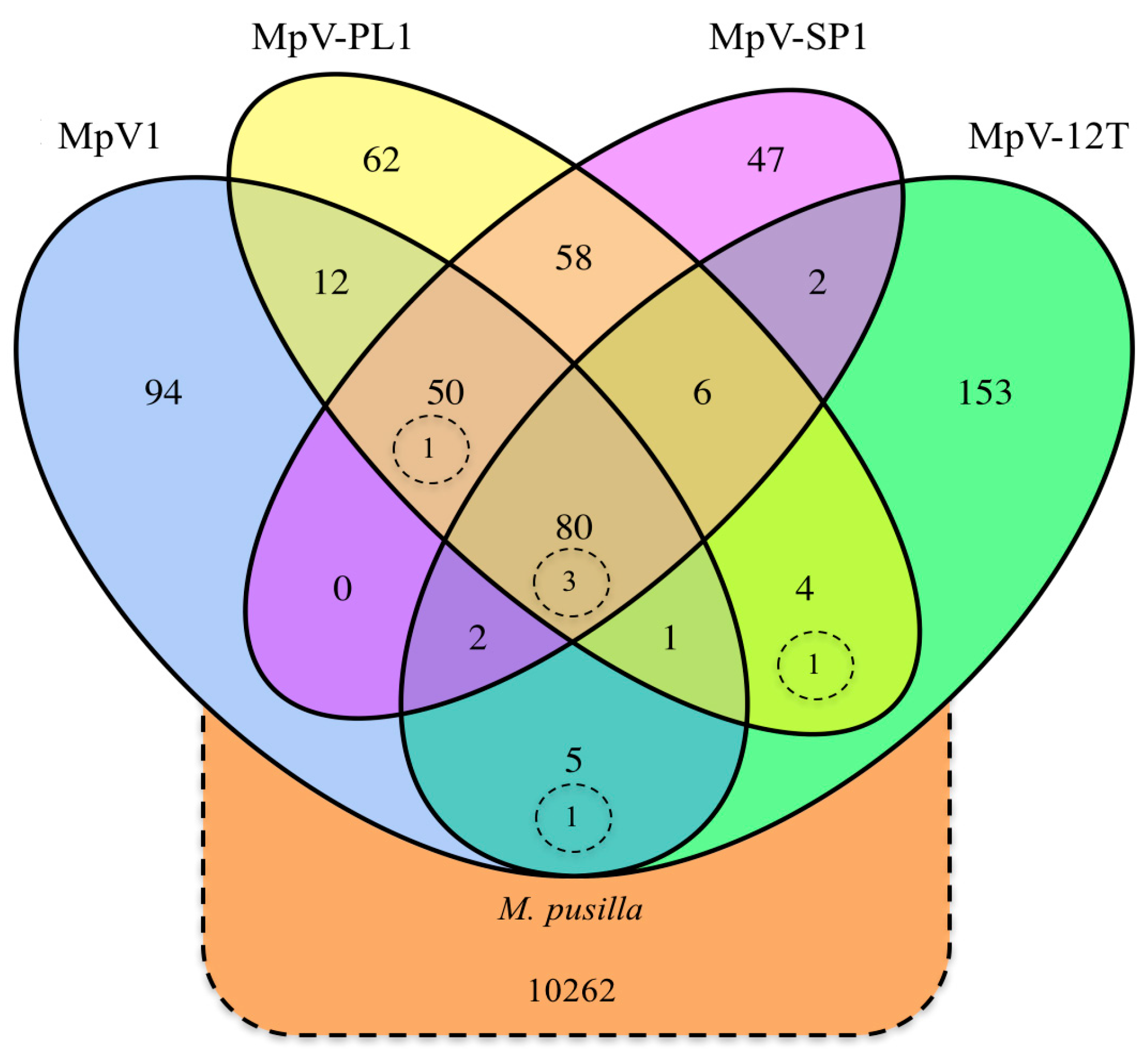
Venn diagram of shared coding sequences (CDS) of four MpVs and M. pusilla UTEX LB991, based on clusters by 0.5 amino acid identity. Dashed circles represent host genes shared with viruses.

The genus contains the following species, listed by scientific name and followed by the exemplar virus of the species:

- Prasinovirus micromonas, Micromonas pusilla virus SP1
- Prasinovirus ostreotauri, Ostreococcus tauri virus OtV5

== Structure ==
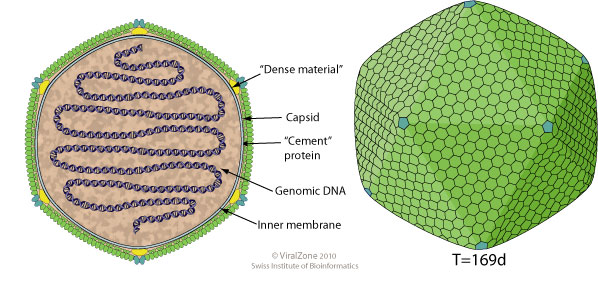
Schematic drawing of a typical Phycodnaviridae virion (cross section and side view)

Viruses in Prasinovirus are enveloped, with icosahedral and round geometries, and T=169 symmetry. The diameter is around 104-118 nm.

Genus	Structure	Symmetry	Capsid	Genomic arrangement	Genomic segmentation
Prasinovirus	Icosahedral	T=169	Enveloped	Linear	Monopartite

== Life cycle ==
Viral replication is nucleo-cytoplasmic. Replication follows the DNA strand displacement model. DNA templated transcription is the method of transcription. The virus exits the host cell by lysis via lytic phospholipids. Alga serve as the natural host. Transmission routes are passive diffusion.

Genus	Host details	Tissue tropism	Entry details	Release details	Replication site	Assembly site	Transmission
Prasinovirus	Alga	None	Cell receptor endocytosis	Lysis	Nucleus	Cytoplasm	Passive diffusion
