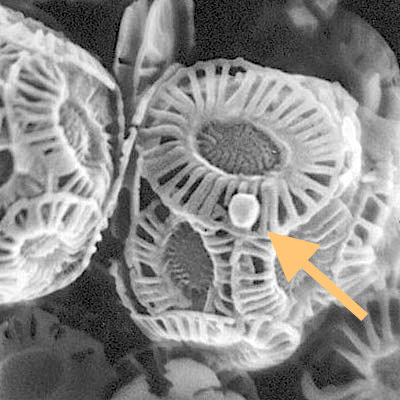
- Giant coccolithovirus, Emiliania huxleyi virus 86 (arrowed), infecting an Emiliania huxleyi coccolithophore

Virus classification
- (unranked): Virus
- Realm: Varidnaviria
- Kingdom: Bamfordvirae
- Phylum: Nucleocytoviricota
- Class: Megaviricetes
- Order: Algavirales
- Family: Phycodnaviridae
- Genus: Coccolithovirus

Strains
- Emiliania huxleyi virus 86; EhV-84 (1999 EC); EhV-88 (1999 EC); EhV-201 (2001 EC); EhV-202 (2001 EC); EhV-203 (2001 EC); EhV-207 (2001 EC); EhV-208 (2001 EC); EhV-18 (2008 EC); EhV-156 (2009 EC); EhV-164 (2008 Scotland); EhV-145 (2008 Scotland); EhV-99B1 (1999 Norway); EhV-163 (2000 Norway)

= Coccolithovirus =

Genus of viruses

Coccolithovirus is a genus of giant double-stranded DNA virus, in the family Phycodnaviridae. Algae, specifically Emiliania huxleyi, a species of coccolithophore, serve as natural hosts. There is only one described species in this genus: Emiliania huxleyi virus 86 (Coccolithovirus huxleyi).

== Structure ==
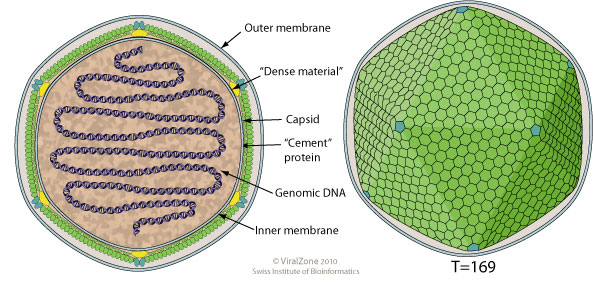
Schematic drawing of a Coccolithovirus virion (cross section and side view)

Coccolithoviruses are enveloped, icosahedral and have a diameter ranging from 100–220 nm. Their genomes are linear, between 410–415kb in length and predict to encode for approximately 472 proteins.

Genus	Structure	Symmetry	Capsid	Genomic arrangement	Genomic segmentation
Coccolithovirus	Icosahedral	T=169	Enveloped	Linear	Monopartite

== Life cycle ==
Coccolithoviruses are part of the family of Phycodnaviridae, one of the five families that belong to a large and phylogenetically diverse group of viruses known as nucleocytoplasmic large dsDNA viruses (NCLDVs). These viruses either replicate exclusively in the cytoplasm of the host cell or start their life cycle in the host nucleus but complete it in the cytoplasm. In the case of EhV-86 the infection strategy is not fully understood but Mackinder et al. (2009) have proposed the following model: The virus enters the host cell via endocytosis, followed by fusion of its lipid membrane with the host vacuole membrane and the release of its nucleoprotein core into the cytoplasm. Alternatively the virus membrane could fuse directly with the host plasma membrane. The virus genome is then released from the capsid into the nucleus, where it is replicated by the viral DNA polymerase. The replicated genome is packed into assembled capsids in the cytoplasm and the newly formed (up to 400–1000) virions are thought to be transported to the plasma membrane and released by a controlled budding mechanism, which leads to the cellular breakdown of the host cell.

During G2 and M stage of the life cycle, the coccosphere is incomplete and the exposure of the plasma membrane to the virus is increased. Even with an intact coccosphere infection can occur due to naturally occurring gaps between the coccoliths.

E. huxleyi is known for forming seasonal algal blooms, that can reach 250,000 km^{2}, during which cell density in the upper 200 m increases from 10^{3} to 10^{5} cells per mL seawater. These algae blooms collapse usually after 5–8 days and several studies have shown that bloom termination is intrinsically linked to infection by coccolithoviruses. Transmission of viruses between algal hosts occurs via passive diffusion. Furthermore, EhV DNA was also detected in copepods, leading to the proposal that viruses are further dispersed by virus-carrying zooplankton.

== Genome ==
To date 14 EhV strains have been isolated between 1999 and 2008 primarily from the English Channel (EC) but also from the Norwegian and Scotland's Coast. Although partial sequences of all these 14 strains are available, EhV-86 is the only strain that has been fully sequenced due to the highly repetitive nature of the genome. The sequencing of EhV-86 revealed a circular genome of 407,339 bp length with 472 predicted coding sequences (CDS). Remarkably 80% of these putative genes have no database homologs to date. Those that could be assigned a function due to sequence similarity or protein domain matches include DNA and RNA polymerase subunits, eight proteases as well as at least four genes that encode proteins involved in sphingolipid biosynthesis. These were shown to have been acquired from the host via horizontal gene transfer.

Furthermore, the EhV-86 genome revealed three distinct families (A, B, C) of repetitive regions within the genome. Family C consists of AT-rich repeats that are non-coding and that are probably part of the origin of replication (ORF). Family B are GC-rich repeats that are found in protein products of eight predicted CDSs. Family A homologous regions vary in size between 30–300 bp and are found in a 104 kbp (200–304 kbp) section of the genome, that contains no gene homologs of known function in the current data bases. Family A repeat units are non-coding and characterised by a nanomer (GTTCCC(T/C)AA) that in total, appears at 106 locations within this region. This sequence is found directly upstream of 86 CDSs and is likely to play a role in controlling the expression of associated CDSs.

During infection a distinct expression pattern of viral genes was described that could be divided into three phases according to CDS expression. One hour post infection, 39 viral genes were transcribed, followed by a further 194 genes after 2 h and 71 genes after 4 h. All 39 genes that are expressed 1 h post infection are located in the 104 kbp region and have the nanomer directly upstream of the start codon. Since the expression of viral RNA polymerase was not detected 1 h after infection, it has yet to be established whether the promoter is recognised by a packaged viral RNA polymerase or by the host RNA polymerase. Proteomic analysis of the EhV-86 virion did, however, fail to detect any major RNA polymerase subunits.

== History ==
William Wilson and his team at the Marine Biological Association (MBA), University of East Anglia and Plymouth Marine Laboratory (PML), first observed the virus in 1999. Later in the summer of 2005 researchers at the Plymouth Marine Laboratory (Willie Wilson et al.) and at the Sanger Institute (Holden et al.) sequenced the genome for the EhV-86 strain finding it to have 472 protein-coding genes, making it a giant virus and the largest known marine virus by genome.

== See also ==
- Mimivirus – largest giant virus on record by genome
- Mycoplasma genitalium, Pelagibacter ubique – some of the smallest known bacteria
- Nanoarchaeum – smallest known archaeum
- Smallest organisms
- Parvovirus – smallest known family of viruses
- Phycodnaviridae – algae infecting viruses

== Notes ==
1. Giant viruses in the oceans: the 4th Algal Virus Workshop Virology Journal 2005
2. Sanger institute home for Emiliania huxleyi virus 86
3. Giantviruses.org top viruses by genome size. Archived 24 June 2006 at the Wayback Machine
4. Plymouth Marine Laboratory press release.
