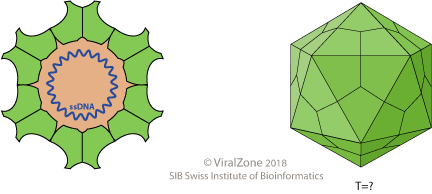

Virus classification
- (unranked): Virus
- Realm: Monodnaviria
- Kingdom: Shotokuvirae
- Phylum: Cressdnaviricota
- Class: Arfiviricetes
- Order: Baphyvirales
- Family: Bacilladnaviridae

= Bacilladnaviridae =

Family of viruses

Bacilladnaviridae is a family of single-stranded DNA viruses that primarily infect diatoms.

== Characteristics ==
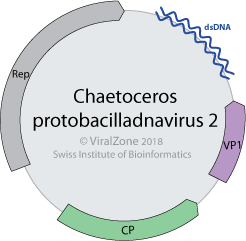
Genome map of species Chaetoceros protobacilladnavirus 2 of family Bacilladnaviridae

Similar to other eukaryotic ssDNA viruses, bacilladnaviruses are likely to replicate their genomes by the rolling-circle mechanism, initiated by the virus-encoded endonuclease (Rep). However, the latter protein of bacilladnaviruses displays unique conserved motifs and in phylogenetic trees forms a monophyletic clade separated from other groups of ssDNA viruses. The capsid protein of bacilladnaviruses has the jelly-roll fold and is most closely related to the corresponding proteins from members of the family Nodaviridae, which have ssRNA genomes.

== Taxonomy ==
The following genera are recognized:

- Aberdnavirus
- Diatodnavirus
- Keisodnavirus
- Kieseladnavirus
- Protobacilladnavirus
- Puahadnavirus
- Seawadnavirus
