= GDP-mannose 4,6-dehydratase =

Class of enzymes

GMDS

Identifiers
- Aliases: GMDS, GMD, SDR3E1, GDP-mannose 4,6-dehydratase
- External IDs: OMIM: 602884; MGI: 1891112; GeneCards: GMDS
Available structures
PDB	Ortholog search: PDBe RCSB
PDB	List of PDB id codes 1T2A
Enzyme activity
EC #	BRENDA	ExPASy	KEGG	MetaCyc
4.2.1.47	↗	↗	↗	↗

Gene location (Human)
Chr.	Chromosome 6 (human)
Band	6p25.3	Start	1,623,806 bp
Band	6p25.3	End	2,245,605 bp

Gene location (Mouse)
Chr.	Chromosome 13 (mouse)
Band	13|13 A3.2	Start	32,003,562 bp
Band	13|13 A3.2	End	32,522,723 bp

RNA expression pattern
Bgee	Human / Mouse (ortholog); Top expressed in: parotid gland; mucosa of transverse colon; Descending thoracic aorta; rectum; ascending aorta; duodenum; minor salivary glands; palpebral conjunctiva; right coronary artery; mucosa of sigmoid colon / Top expressed in: Paneth cell; epithelium of stomach; large intestine; colon; duodenum; jejunum; left colon; ileum; rib; epithelium of small intestine; More reference expression data
BioGPS	More reference expression data
Gene ontology
Molecular function	protein binding; NADP+ binding; lyase activity; GDP-mannose 4,6-dehydratase activity; identical protein binding
Cellular component	cytosol; extracellular exosome; cytoplasm
Biological process	GDP-mannose metabolic process; 'de novo' GDP-L-fucose biosynthetic process; Notch signaling pathway
Sources:Amigo / QuickGO
Orthologs
Databases	NCBI: entry; OMA: entry
Species	Human	Mouse
Entrez	2762	218138
Ensembl	ENSG00000112699	ENSMUSG00000038372
UniProt	O60547	Q8K0C9
RefSeq (mRNA)	NM_001253846; NM_001500	NM_146041
RefSeq (protein)	NP_001240775; NP_001491	NP_666153
Location (UCSC)	Chr 6: 1.62 – 2.25 Mb	Chr 13: 32 – 32.52 Mb
PubMed search
- Wikidata
View/Edit Human	View/Edit Mouse

GDP-mannose 4,6-dehydratase
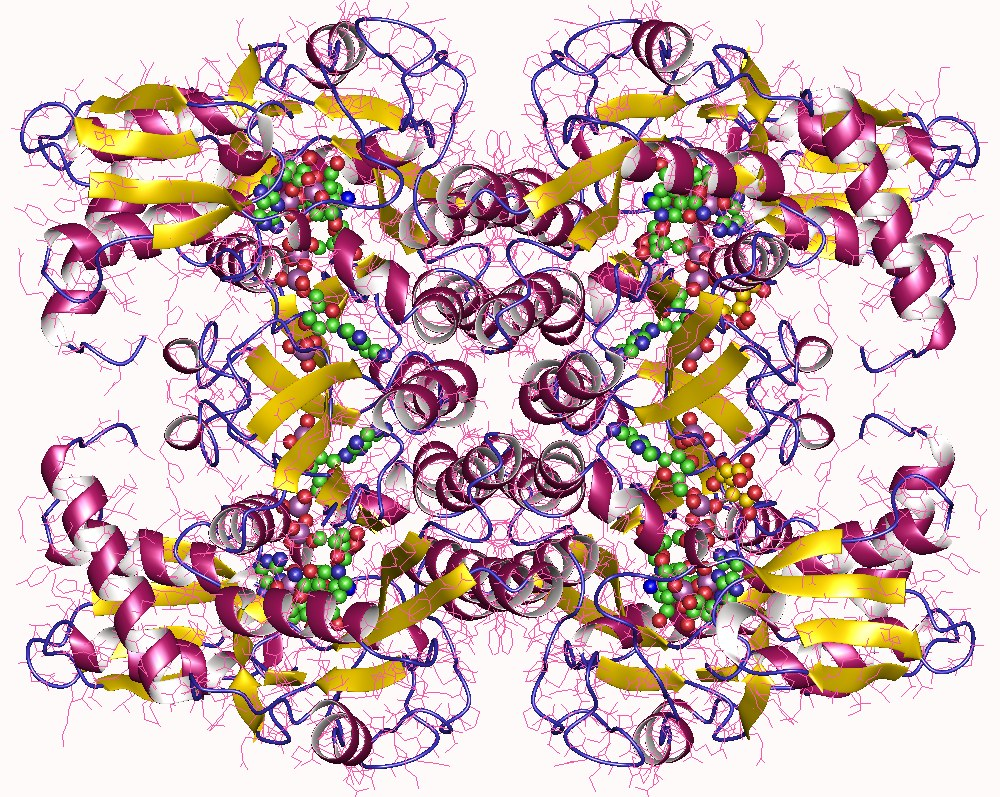

Identifiers
- EC no.: 4.2.1.47
- CAS no.: 37211-59-9

Databases
- BRENDA: enzyme data
- ExPASy: NiceZyme view
- KEGG: enzyme entry
- MetaCyc: metabolic pathway
- Rhea: reactions
- PDB structures: RCSB PDB PDBe PDBsum
- Gene Ontology: AmiGO / QuickGO
Search
- PMC: articles
- PubMed: articles
- NCBI: proteins

GDP-mannose 4,6-dehydratase (EC 4.2.1.47) is an enzyme which in humans is encoded by the GMDS gene. GDP-mannose 4,6-dehydratase catalyzes the chemical reaction

GDP-mannose $\rightleftharpoons$ GDP-4-dehydro-6-deoxy-D-mannose + H_{2}O

This enzyme belongs to the family of lyases, specifically the hydro-lyases, which cleave carbon-oxygen bonds. The systematic name of this enzyme class is GDP-mannose 4,6-hydro-lyase (GDP-4-dehydro-6-deoxy-D-mannose-forming). Other names in common use include guanosine 5'-diphosphate-D-mannose oxidoreductase, guanosine diphosphomannose oxidoreductase, guanosine diphosphomannose 4,6-dehydratase, GDP-D-mannose dehydratase, GDP-D-mannose 4,6-dehydratase, Gmd, and GDP-mannose 4,6-hydro-lyase. This enzyme participates in fructose and mannose metabolism. It employs one cofactor, NAD^{+}.

== Gdp-mannose 4, 6-dehydratase reaction ==
The enzyme GDP-Mannose 4, 6-Dehydratase is in the lyase family of enzymes, specifically the hydro-lyases. Other names in use include guanosine 5'-diphosphate-D-mannose oxidoreductase, guanosine diphosphomannose oxidoreductase, guanosine diphosphomannose 4,6-dehydratase, GDP-D-mannose dehydratase, GDP-D-mannose 4,6-dehydratase, GMD, and GDP-mannose 4,6-hydro-lyase. The enzyme is a part of the GDP-Fucose de novo synthesis pathway and catalyzes the first step in the process that gives us GDP-Fucose which is essential for the transfer of Fucose sugars. Its primary structure contains 372 amino acids. This is an essential enzyme in that fucose plays a major role in cell immunity and signaling. Currently GDP-Mannose 4, 6-Dehydratase is not the target of any available drugs, however it is being experimentally targeted with the drug Guanosine-5'-Diphosphate. The chemical reaction of GDP-Mannose 4, 6-Dehydratase is as shown:

GDP-mannose ↔ GDP-4-dehydro-6-deoxy-D-mannose + H_{2}O

== Factors in the reaction ==
The enzymes substrate, what the enzyme is acting on, is the GDP-Mannose substance. No other substrates are use this enzyme for reactions.

When the enzyme undergoes its catalyzing process the main product is gets is when it converts GDP-mannose to GDP-4-dehydro-6-deoxy-D-mannose which is then subsequently converted to GDP-Fucose which is crucial for the body to process correctly. It acts as an intermediate step between GDP-Mannose and GDP-Fucose.

In the reaction that the enzyme uses it requires only one cofactor, a compound required for activation, which is NADP(+) however it is uncertain if this compound truly activates the enzyme.

GDP-Fucose is an allosteric inhibitor of the enzyme.

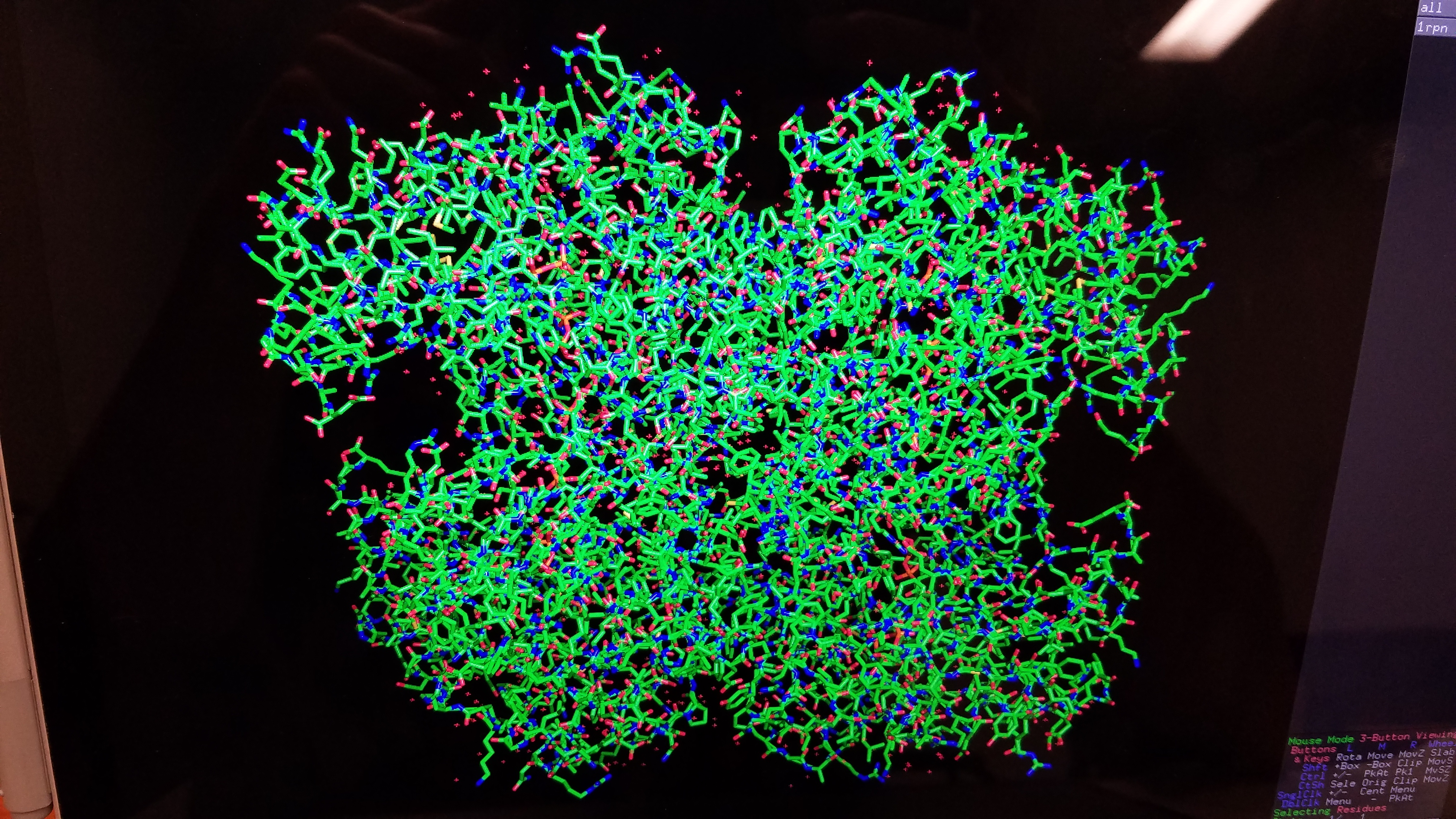
Here is a pymol view of the entire structure of the GDP-Mannose 4, 6-Dehydratase enzyme.

== Gdp-fucose biosynthesis pathway ==
The enzyme GDP-Mannose 4, 6-Dehydratase is only present in one pathway that we know of. This pathway is the GDP-mannose-dependent de novo pathway which provides most of the bodies GDP-Fucose whereas minor amounts come from fucose salvaging in the body.

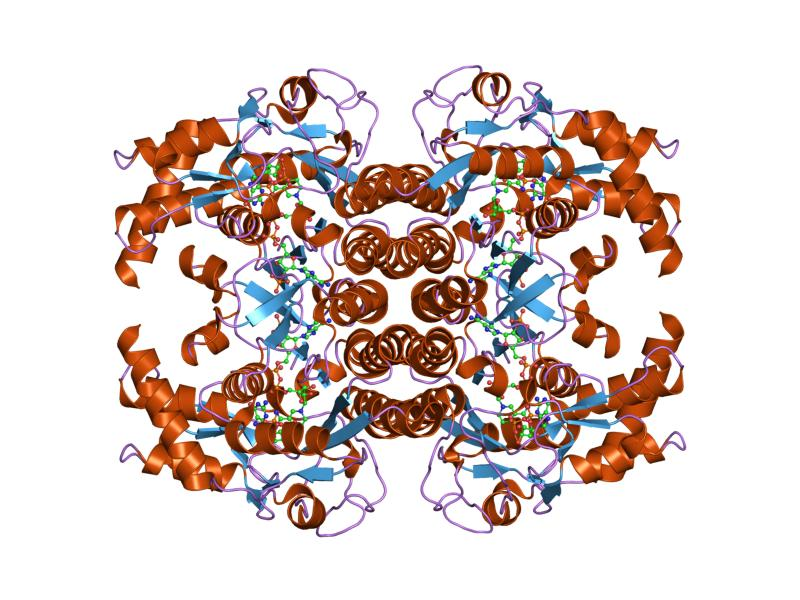
Here we can see the full crystal structure of the GDP enzyme. Use this link to find the subunits of the enzyme http://www.rcsb.org/pdb/explore/jmol.do?structureId=1RPN&opt=3 PDB 1rpn

In the pathway the enzyme is in an intermediate step that converts GDP-Mannose to GDP-4-dehydro-6-deoxy-D-mannose which is then converted into GDP-Fucose which is absolutely crucial to the body. The product of this pathway is fucosyltransferases which is then used in a different pathway that creates fucosylated glycans which is used for cell signaling and immunity in the body. Fucose is a deoxyhexose that is present in a wide variety of organisms. In most mammals, fucose-containing glycans have important roles in blood transfusion reactions, selectin-mediated leukocyte-endothelial adhesion, host-microbe interactions, and numerous ontogenic events. Along with those the body uses fucose as signaling branches of a cell and also as identification systems in immunity. However the enzyme only works at its top levels under normal body conditions. Increased pH or heat could severely denature the protein causing the enzyme to malfunction.

=== Gdp-mannose 4, 6-dehydratase structure ===
The enzyme contains four different subunits. Here is a link for a 3-D view of the enzyme http://www.rcsb.org/pdb/explore/jmol.do?structureId=1RPN&bionumber=1

== Structural studies ==
As of late 2007, 5 structures have been solved for this class of enzymes, with PDB accession codes PDB: 1DB3, PDB: 1N7G, PDB: 1N7H, PDB: 1RPN, and PDB: 1T2A.
